The history of the Netherlands is a history of seafaring people living in the lowland river delta on the North Sea in northwestern Europe. Records begin with the four centuries during which the region formed a militarized border zone of the Roman Empire. This came under increasing pressure from Germanic peoples moving westwards. As Roman power collapsed and the Middle Ages began, three dominant Germanic peoples coalesced in the area, Frisians in the north and coastal areas, Low Saxons in the northeast, and the Franks in the south.

During the Middle Ages, the descendants of the Carolingian dynasty came to dominate the area and then extended their rule to a large part of Western Europe. The region nowadays corresponding to the Netherlands therefore became part of Lower Lotharingia within the Frankish Holy Roman Empire. For several centuries, lordships such as Brabant, Holland, Zeeland, Friesland, Guelders and others held a changing patchwork of territories. There was no unified equivalent of the modern Netherlands.

By 1433, the Duke of Burgundy had assumed control over most of the lowlands territories in Lower Lotharingia; he created the Burgundian Netherlands which included modern Netherlands, Belgium, Luxembourg, and a part of France.

The Catholic kings of Spain took strong measures against Protestantism, which polarised the peoples of present-day Belgium and the Netherlands. The subsequent Dutch revolt led to the splitting in 1581 of the Burgundian Netherlands into a Catholic, French- and Dutch-speaking "Spanish Netherlands" (approximately corresponding to modern Belgium and Luxembourg), and a northern "United Provinces" (or "Dutch Republic)", which spoke Dutch and was predominantly Protestant. The latter entity became the modern Netherlands.

In the Dutch Golden Age, which had its zenith around 1667, there was a flowering of trade, industry, and the sciences. A rich worldwide Dutch empire developed and the Dutch East India Company became one of the earliest and most important of national mercantile companies based on invasion, colonialism and extraction of outside resources.

During the eighteenth century, the power, wealth and influence of the Netherlands declined. A series of wars with the more powerful British and French neighbours weakened it. The English seized the North American colony of New Amsterdam, and renamed it "New York". There was growing unrest and conflict between the Orangists and the Patriots. The French Revolution spilled over after 1789, and a pro-French Batavian Republic was established in 1795–1806. Napoleon made it a satellite state, the Kingdom of Holland (1806–1810), and later simply a French imperial province.

After the defeat of Napoleon in 1813–1815, an expanded "United Kingdom of the Netherlands" was created with the House of Orange as monarchs, also ruling Belgium and Luxembourg. The King imposed unpopular Protestant reforms on Belgium, which revolted in 1830 and became independent in 1839. After an initially conservative period, following the introduction of the 1848 constitution, the country became a parliamentary democracy with a constitutional monarch. Modern-day Luxembourg became officially independent from the Netherlands in 1839, but a personal union remained until 1890. Since 1890, it is ruled by another branch of the House of Nassau.

The Netherlands was neutral during the First World War, but during the Second World War, it was invaded and occupied by Nazi Germany. The Nazis, including many collaborators, rounded up and killed almost all of the country's Jewish population. When the Dutch resistance increased, the Nazis cut off food supplies to much of the country, causing severe starvation in 1944–1945. In 1942, the Dutch East Indies were conquered by Japan, but prior to this the Dutch destroyed the oil wells for which Japan was desperate. Indonesia proclaimed its independence from the Netherlands in 1945, followed by Suriname in 1975. The post-war years saw rapid economic recovery (helped by the American Marshall Plan), followed by the introduction of a welfare state during an era of peace and prosperity. The Netherlands formed a new economic alliance with Belgium and Luxembourg, the Benelux, and all three became founding members of the European Union and NATO. In recent decades, the Dutch economy has been closely linked to that of Germany and is highly prosperous. The four countries adopted the Euro on 1 January 2002, along with eight other EU member states.

Prehistory (before 800 BC)

Historical changes to the landscape
The prehistory of the area that is now the Netherlands was largely shaped by its constantly shifting, low-lying geography.

Earliest groups of hunter-gatherers (before 5000 BC)

The area that is now the Netherlands was inhabited by early humans at least 37,000 years ago, as attested by flint tools discovered in Woerden in 2010. In 2009 a fragment of a 40,000-year-old Neanderthal skull was found in sand dredged from the North Sea floor off the coast of Zeeland.

During the last ice age, the Netherlands had a tundra climate with scarce vegetation and the inhabitants survived as hunter-gatherers. After the end of the ice age, various Paleolithic groups inhabited the area. It is known that around 8000 BC a Mesolithic tribe resided near Burgumer Mar (Friesland). Another group residing elsewhere is known to have made canoes. The oldest recovered canoe in the world is the Pesse canoe. According to C14 dating analysis it was constructed somewhere between 8200 BC and 7600 BC. This canoe is exhibited in the Drents Museum in Assen.

Autochthonous hunter-gatherers from the Swifterbant culture are attested from around 5600 BC onwards. They are strongly linked to rivers and open water and were related to the southern Scandinavian Ertebølle culture (5300–4000 BC). To the west, the same tribes might have built hunting camps to hunt winter game, including seals.

The arrival of farming (around 5000–4000 BC)
Agriculture arrived in the Netherlands somewhere around 5000 BC with the Linear Pottery culture, who were probably central European farmers. Agriculture was practiced only on the loess plateau in the very south (southern Limburg), but even there it was not established permanently. Farms did not develop in the rest of the Netherlands.

There is also some evidence of small settlements in the rest of the country. These people made the switch to animal husbandry sometime between 4800 BC and 4500 BC. Dutch archaeologist Leendert Louwe Kooijmans wrote, "It is becoming increasingly clear that the agricultural transformation of prehistoric communities was a purely indigenous process that took place very gradually." This transformation took place as early as 4300 BC–4000 BC and featured the introduction of grains in small quantities into a traditional broad-spectrum economy.

Funnelbeaker and other cultures (around 4000–3000 BC)

The Funnelbeaker culture was a farming culture extending from Denmark through northern Germany into the northern Netherlands. In this period of Dutch prehistory, the first notable remains were erected: the dolmens, large stone grave monuments. They are found in Drenthe, and were probably built between 4100 BC and 3200 BC.

To the west, the Vlaardingen culture (around 2600 BC), an apparently more primitive culture of hunter-gatherers survived well into the Neolithic period.

Corded Ware and Bell Beaker cultures (around 3000–2000 BC)
Around 2950 BCE there was a transition from the Funnelbeaker farming culture to the Corded Ware pastoralist culture, a large archeological horizon appearing in western and central Europe, that is associated with the advance of Indo-European languages. This transition was probably caused by developments in eastern Germany, and it occurred within two generations.

The Bell Beaker culture was also present in the Netherlands.

The Corded Ware and Bell Beaker cultures were not indigenous to the Netherlands but were pan-European in nature, extending across much of northern and central Europe.

The first evidence of the use of the wheel dates from this period, about 2400 BC. This culture also experimented with working with copper. Evidence of this, including stone anvils, copper knives, and a copper spearhead, was found on the Veluwe. Copper finds show that there was trade with other areas in Europe, as natural copper is not found in Dutch soil.

Bronze Age (around 2000–800 BC)

The Bronze Age probably started somewhere around 2000 BC and lasted until around 800 BC. The earliest bronze tools have been found in the grave of a Bronze Age individual called "the smith of Wageningen". More Bronze Age objects from later periods have been found in Epe, Drouwen and elsewhere. Broken bronze objects found in Voorschoten were apparently destined for recycling. This indicates how valuable bronze was considered in the Bronze Age. Typical bronze objects from this period included knives, swords, axes, fibulae and bracelets.

Most of the Bronze Age objects found in the Netherlands have been found in Drenthe. One item shows that trading networks during this period extended a far distance. Large bronze situlae (buckets) found in Drenthe were manufactured somewhere in eastern France or in Switzerland. They were used for mixing wine with water (a Roman/Greek custom). The many finds in Drenthe of rare and valuable objects, such as tin-bead necklaces, suggest that Drenthe was a trading centre in the Netherlands in the Bronze Age.

The Bell Beaker cultures (2700–2100) locally developed into the Bronze Age Barbed-Wire Beaker culture (2100–1800). In the second millennium BC, the region was the boundary between the Atlantic and Nordic horizons and was split into a northern and a southern region, roughly divided by the course of the Rhine.

In the north, the Elp culture (c. 1800 to 800 BC) was a Bronze Age archaeological culture having earthenware pottery of low quality known as "Kümmerkeramik" (or "Grobkeramik") as a marker. The initial phase was characterized by tumuli (1800–1200 BC) that were strongly tied to contemporary tumuli in northern Germany and Scandinavia, and were apparently related to the Tumulus culture (1600–1200 BC) in central Europe. This phase was followed by a subsequent change featuring Urnfield (cremation) burial customs (1200–800 BC). The southern region became dominated by the Hilversum culture (1800–800), which apparently inherited the cultural ties with Britain of the previous Barbed-Wire Beaker culture.

The pre-Roman period (800 BC – 58 BC)

Iron Age

The Iron Age brought a measure of prosperity to the people living in the area of the present-day Netherlands. Iron ore was available throughout the country, including bog iron extracted from the ore in peat bogs (moeras ijzererts) in the north, the natural iron-bearing balls found in the Veluwe and the red iron ore near the rivers in Brabant. Smiths travelled from small settlement to settlement with bronze and iron, fabricating tools on demand, including axes, knives, pins, arrowheads and swords. Some evidence even suggests the making of Damascus steel swords using an advanced method of forging that combined the flexibility of iron with the strength of steel.

In Oss, a grave dating from around 500 BC was found in a burial mound 52 metres wide (and thus the largest of its kind in western Europe). Dubbed the "king's grave" (Vorstengraf (Oss)), it contained extraordinary objects, including an iron sword with an inlay of gold and coral.

In the centuries just before the arrival of the Romans, northern areas formerly occupied by the Elp culture emerged as the probably Germanic Harpstedt culture while the southern parts were influenced by the Hallstatt culture and assimilated into the Celtic La Tène culture. The contemporary southern and western migration of Germanic groups and the northern expansion of the Hallstatt culture drew these peoples into each other's sphere of influence. This is consistent with Caesar's account of the Rhine forming the boundary between Celtic and Germanic tribes.

Arrival of Germanic groups

The Germanic tribes originally inhabited southern Scandinavia, Schleswig-Holstein and Hamburg, but subsequent Iron Age cultures of the same region, like Wessenstedt (800–600 BC) and Jastorf, may also have belonged to this grouping.
The climate deteriorating in Scandinavia around 850 BC to 760 BC and later and faster around 650 BC might have triggered migrations. Archaeological evidence suggests around 750 BC a relatively uniform Germanic people from the Netherlands to the Vistula and southern Scandinavia. In the west, the newcomers settled the coastal floodplains for the first time, since in adjacent higher grounds the population had increased and the soil had become exhausted.

By the time this migration was complete, around 250 BC, a few general cultural and linguistic groupings had emerged.

One grouping – labelled the "North Sea Germanic" – inhabited the northern part of the Netherlands (north of the great rivers) and extending along the North Sea and into Jutland. This group is also sometimes referred to as the "Ingvaeones". Included in this group are the peoples who would later develop into, among others, the early Frisians and the early Saxons.

A second grouping, which scholars subsequently dubbed the "Weser-Rhine Germanic" (or "Rhine-Weser Germanic"), extended along the middle Rhine and Weser and inhabited the southern part of the Netherlands (south of the great rivers). This group, also sometimes referred to as the "Istvaeones", consisted of tribes that would eventually develop into the Salian Franks.

Celts in the south

The Celtic culture had its origins in the central European Hallstatt culture (c. 800–450 BC), named for the rich grave finds in Hallstatt, Austria. By the later La Tène period (c. 450 BC up to the Roman conquest), this Celtic culture had, whether by diffusion or migration, expanded over a wide range, including into the southern area of the Netherlands. This would have been the northern reach of the Gauls.

In March 2005 17 Celtic coins were found in Echt (Limburg). The silver coins, mixed with copper and gold, date from around 50 BC to 20 AD. In October 2008 a hoard of 39 gold coins and 70 silver Celtic coins was found in the Amby area of Maastricht. The gold coins were attributed to the Eburones people. Celtic objects have also been found in the area of Zutphen.

Although it is rare for hoards to be found, in past decades loose Celtic coins and other objects have been found throughout the central, eastern and southern part of the Netherlands. According to archaeologists these finds confirmed that at least the Meuse river valley in the Netherlands was within the influence of the La Tène culture. Dutch archaeologists even speculate that Zutphen (which lies in the centre of the country) was a Celtic area before the Romans arrived, not a Germanic one at all.

Scholars debate the actual extent of the Celtic influence. The Celtic influence and contacts between Gaulish and early Germanic culture along the Rhine is assumed to be the source of a number of Celtic loanwords in Proto-Germanic. But according to Belgian linguist Luc van Durme, toponymic evidence of a former Celtic presence in the Low Countries is near to utterly absent. Although there were Celts in the Netherlands, Iron Age innovations did not involve substantial Celtic intrusions and featured a local development from Bronze Age culture.

The Nordwestblock theory
Some scholars (De Laet, Gysseling, Hachmann, Kossack & Kuhn) have speculated that a separate ethnic identity, neither Germanic nor Celtic, survived in the Netherlands until the Roman period. They see the Netherlands as having been part of an Iron Age "Nordwestblock" stretching from the Somme to the Weser. Their view is that this culture, which had its own language, was being absorbed by the Celts to the south and the Germanic peoples from the east as late as the immediate pre-Roman period.

Roman era (57 BC – 410 AD)

Native tribes
During the Gallic Wars, the Belgic area south of the Oude Rijn and west of the Rhine was conquered by Roman forces under Julius Caesar in a series of campaigns from 57 BC to 53 BC. The tribes located in the area of the Netherlands at this time did not leave behind written records, so all the information known about them during this pre-Roman period is based on what the Romans and Greeks wrote about them. One of the most important is Caesar's own Commentarii de Bello Gallico. Two main tribes he described as living in what is now the Netherlands were the Menapii, and the Eburones, both in the south, which is where Caesar was active. He established the principle that the Rhine defined a natural boundary between Gaul and Germania magna. But the Rhine was not a strong border, and he made it clear that there was a part of Belgic Gaul where many of the local tribes (including the Eburones) were "Germani cisrhenani", or in other cases, of mixed origin.

The Menapii stretched from the south of Zeeland, through North Brabant (and possibly South Holland), into the southeast of Gelderland. In later Roman times their territory seems to have been divided or reduced, so that it became mainly contained in what is now western Belgium.

The Eburones, the largest of the Germani Cisrhenani group, covered a large area including at least part of modern Dutch Limburg, stretching east to the Rhine in Germany, and also northwest to the delta, giving them a border with the Menapii. Their territory may have stretched into Gelderland.

In the delta itself, Caesar makes a passing comment about the Insula Batavorum ("Island of the Batavi") in the Rhine river, without discussing who lived there. Later, in imperial times, a tribe called the Batavi became very important in this region. Much later Tacitus wrote that they had originally been a tribe of the Chatti, a tribe in Germany never mentioned by Caesar. However, archaeologists find evidence of continuity, and suggest that the Chattic group may have been a small group, moving into a pre-existing (and possibly non-Germanic) people, who could even have been part of a known group such as the Eburones.

The approximately 450 years of Roman rule that followed would profoundly change the area that would become the Netherlands. Very often this involved large-scale conflict with the free Germanic tribes over the Rhine.

Other tribes who eventually inhabited the islands in the delta during Roman times are mentioned by Pliny the Elder are the Cananefates in South Holland; the Frisii, covering most of the modern Netherlands north of the Oude Rijn; the Frisiabones, who apparently stretched from the delta into the North of North Brabant; the Marsacii, who stretched from the Flemish coast, into the delta; and the Sturii.

Caesar reported that he eliminated the name of the Eburones but in their place the Texuandri inhabited most of North Brabant, and the modern province of Limburg, with the Maas running through it, appears to have been inhabited in imperial times by (from north to south) the Baetasii, the Catualini, the Sunuci and the Tungri. (Tacitus reported that the Tungri was a new name for the earlier Germani cisrhenani.)

North of the Old Rhine, apart from the Frisii, Pliny reports some Chauci reached into the delta, and two other tribes known from the eastern Netherlands were the Tuihanti (or Tubantes) from Twenthe in Overijssel, and the Chamavi, from Hamaland in northern Gelderland, who became one of the first tribes to be named as Frankish (see below). The Salians, also Franks, probably originated in Salland in Overijssel, before they moved into the empire, forced by Saxons in the 4th century, first into Batavia, and then into Toxandria.

Roman settlements in the Netherlands

Starting about 15 BC, the Rhine, in the Netherlands came to be defended by the Lower Limes Germanicus. After a series of military actions, the Rhine became fixed around 12 AD as Rome's northern frontier on the European mainland. A number of towns and developments would arise along this line. The area to the south would be integrated into the Roman Empire. At first part of Gallia Belgica, this area became part of the province of Germania Inferior. The tribes already within, or relocated to, this area became part of the Roman Empire. The area to the north of the Rhine, inhabited by the Frisii and the Chauci, remained outside Roman rule but not its presence and control.

Romans built military forts along the Limes Germanicus and a number of towns and smaller settlements in the Netherlands. The more notable Roman towns were at Nijmegen (Ulpia Noviomagus Batavorum) and at Voorburg (Forum Hadriani).

Perhaps the most evocative Roman ruin is the mysterious Brittenburg, which emerged from the sand at the beach in Katwijk several centuries ago, only to be buried again. These ruins were part of Lugdunum Batavorum.

Other Roman settlements, fortifications, temples and other structures have been found at Alphen aan de Rijn (Albaniana); Bodegraven; Cuijk; Elst, Overbetuwe; Ermelo; Esch; Heerlen; Houten; Kessel, North Brabant; Oss, i.e. De Lithse Ham near Maren-Kessel; Kesteren in Neder-Betuwe; Leiden (Matilo); Maastricht; Meinerswijk (now part of Arnhem); Tiel; Utrecht (Traiectum); Valkenburg (South Holland) (Praetorium Agrippinae); Vechten (Fectio) now part of Bunnik; Velsen; Vleuten; Wijk bij Duurstede (Levefanum); Woerden (Laurium or Laurum); and Zwammerdam (Nigrum Pullum).

Batavian revolt

The Batavians, Cananefates, and the other border tribes were held in high regard as soldiers throughout the empire, and traditionally served in the Roman cavalry. The frontier culture was influenced by the Romans, Germanic people, and Gauls. In the first centuries after Rome's conquest of Gaul, trade flourished. And Roman, Gaulish and Germanic material culture are found combined in the region.

However, the Batavians rose against the Romans in the Batavian rebellion of 69 AD. The leader of this revolt was Batavian Gaius Julius Civilis. One of the causes of the rebellion was that the Romans had taken young Batavians as slaves. A number of Roman castella were attacked and burnt. Other Roman soldiers in Xanten and elsewhere and auxiliary troops of Batavians and Canninefatae in the legions of Vitellius) joined the revolt, thus splitting the northern part of the Roman army. In April 70 AD, a few legions sent by Vespasianus and commanded by Quintus Petillius Cerialis eventually defeated the Batavians and negotiated surrender with Gaius Julius Civilis somewhere between the Waal and the Meuse near Noviomagus (Nijmegen), which was probably called "Batavodurum" by the Batavians. The Batavians later merged with other tribes and became part of the Salian Franks.

Dutch writers in the 17th and 18th centuries saw the rebellion of the independent and freedom-loving Batavians as mirroring the Dutch revolt against Spain and other forms of tyranny. According to this nationalist view, the Batavians were the "true" forefathers of the Dutch, which explains the recurring use of the name over the centuries. Jakarta was named "Batavia" by the Dutch in 1619. The Dutch republic created in 1795 on the basis of French revolutionary principles was called the Batavian Republic. Even today Batavian is a term sometimes used to describe the Dutch people; this is similar to use of Gallic to describe the French and Teutonic to describe the Germans.

Emergence of the Franks

Modern scholars of the Migration Period are in agreement that the Frankish identity emerged at the first half of the 3rd century out of various earlier, smaller Germanic groups, including the Salii, Sicambri, Chamavi, Bructeri, Chatti, Chattuarii, Ampsivarii, Tencteri, Ubii, Batavi and the Tungri, who inhabited the lower and middle Rhine valley between the Zuyder Zee and the river Lahn and extended eastwards as far as the Weser, but were the most densely settled around the IJssel and between the Lippe and the Sieg. The Frankish confederation probably began to coalesce in the 210s.

The Franks eventually were divided into two groups: the Ripuarian Franks (Latin: Ripuari), who were the Franks that lived along the middle-Rhine River during the Roman Era, and the Salian Franks, who were the Franks that originated in the area of the Netherlands.

Franks appear in Roman texts as both allies and enemies (laeti and dediticii). By about 320, the Franks had the region of the Scheldt river (present day west Flanders and southwest Netherlands) under control, and were raiding the Channel, disrupting transportation to Britain. Roman forces pacified the region, but did not expel the Franks, who continued to be feared as pirates along the shores at least until the time of Julian the Apostate (358), when Salian Franks were allowed to settle as foederati in Toxandria, according to Ammianus Marcellinus.

Disappearance of the Frisii?

Three factors contributed to the probable disappearance of the Frisii from the northern Netherlands. First, according to the Panegyrici Latini (Manuscript VIII), the ancient Frisii were forced to resettle within Roman territory as laeti (i.e., Roman-era serfs) in c. 296. This is the last reference to the ancient Frisii in the historical record. What happened to them, however, is suggested in the archaeological record. The discovery of a type of earthenware unique to 4th-century Frisia, called terp Tritzum, shows that an unknown number of them were resettled in Flanders and Kent, likely as laeti under Roman coercion.
Second, the environment in the low-lying coastal regions of northwestern Europe began to lower c. 250 and gradually receded over the next 200 years. Tectonic subsidence, a rising water table and storm surges combined to flood some areas with marine transgressions. This was accelerated by a shift to a cooler, wetter climate in the region. Any Frisii left in the lower areas of Frisia would have drowned.
Third, after the collapse of the Roman Empire, there was a decline in population as Roman activity stopped and Roman institutions withdrew. As a result of these three factors, it has been postulated that the Frisii and Frisiaevones disappeared from the area, leaving the coastal lands largely unpopulated for the next two centuries. However, recent excavations in the coastal dunes of Kennemerland show clear indication of a permanent habitation.

Early Middle Ages (411–1000)

Frisians

As climatic conditions improved, there was another mass migration of Germanic peoples into the area from the east. This is known as the "Migration Period" (Volksverhuizingen). The northern Netherlands received an influx of new migrants and settlers, mostly Saxons, but also Angles and Jutes. Many of these migrants did not stay in the northern Netherlands but moved on to England and are known today as the Anglo-Saxons. The newcomers who stayed in the northern Netherlands would eventually be referred to as "Frisians", although they were not descended from the ancient Frisii. These new Frisians settled in the northern Netherlands and would become the ancestors of the modern Frisians. (Because the early Frisians and Anglo-Saxons were formed from largely identical tribal confederacies, their respective languages were very similar. Old Frisian is the most closely related language to Old English and the modern Frisian dialects are in turn the closest related languages to contemporary English.) By the end of the 6th century, the Frisian territory in the northern Netherlands had expanded west to the North Sea coast and, by the 7th century, south to Dorestad. During this period most of the northern Netherlands was known as Frisia. This extended Frisian territory is sometimes referred to as Frisia Magna (or Greater Frisia).

In the 7th and 8th centuries, the Frankish chronologies mention this area as the kingdom of the Frisians. This kingdom comprised the coastal provinces of the Netherlands and the German North Sea coast. During this time, the Frisian language was spoken along the entire southern North Sea coast. The 7th-century Frisian Kingdom (650–734) under King Aldegisel and King Redbad, had its centre of power in Utrecht.

Dorestad was the largest settlement (emporia) in northwestern Europe. It had grown around a former Roman fortress. It was a large, flourishing trading place, three kilometers long and situated where the rivers Rhine and Lek diverge southeast of Utrecht near the modern town of Wijk bij Duurstede. Although inland, it was a North Sea trading centre that primarily handled goods from the Middle Rhineland. Wine was among the major products traded at Dorestad, likely from vineyards south of Mainz. It was also widely known because of its mint. Between 600 and around 719 Dorestad was often fought over between the Frisians and the Franks.

Franks

After Roman government in the area collapsed, the Franks expanded their territories until there were numerous small Frankish kingdoms, especially at Cologne, Tournai, Le Mans and Cambrai. The kings of Tournai eventually came to subdue the other Frankish kings. By the 490s, Clovis I had conquered and united all the Frankish territories to the west of the Meuse, including those in the southern Netherlands. He continued his conquests into Gaul.

After the death of Clovis I in 511, his four sons partitioned his kingdom amongst themselves, with Theuderic I receiving the lands that were to become Austrasia (including the southern Netherlands). A line of kings descended from Theuderic ruled Austrasia until 555, when it was united with the other Frankish kingdoms of Chlothar I, who inherited all the Frankish realms by 558. He redivided the Frankish territory amongst his four sons, but the four kingdoms coalesced into three on the death of Charibert I in 567. Austrasia (including the southern Netherlands) was given to Sigebert I. The southern Netherlands remained the northern part of Austrasia until the rise of the Carolingians.

The Franks who expanded south into Gaul settled there and eventually adopted the Vulgar Latin of the local population. However, a Germanic language was spoken as a second tongue by public officials in western Austrasia and Neustria as late as the 850s. It completely disappeared as a spoken language from these regions during the 10th century. During this expansion to the south, many Frankish people remained in the north (i.e. southern Netherlands, Flanders and a small part of northern France). A widening cultural divide grew between the Franks remaining in the north and the rulers far to the south in what is now France. Salian Franks continued to reside in their original homeland and the area directly to the south and to speak their original language, Old Frankish, which by the 9th century had evolved into Old Dutch. A Dutch-French language boundary came into existence (but this was originally south of where it is today). In the Maas and Rhine areas of the Netherlands, the Franks had political and trading centres, especially at Nijmegen and Maastricht. These Franks remained in contact with the Frisians to the north, especially in places like Dorestad and Utrecht.

Modern doubts about the traditional Frisian, Frank and Saxon distinction

In the late 19th century, Dutch historians believed that the Franks, Frisians, and Saxons were the original ancestors of the Dutch people. Some went further by ascribing certain attributes, values and strengths to these various groups and proposing that they reflected 19th-century nationalist and religious views. In particular, it was believed that this theory explained why Belgium and the southern Netherlands (i.e. the Franks) had become Catholic and the northern Netherlands (Frisians and Saxons) had become Protestant. The success of this theory was partly due to anthropological theories based on a tribal paradigm. Being politically and geographically inclusive, and yet accounting for diversity, this theory was in accordance with the need for nation-building and integration during the 1890–1914 period. The theory was taught in Dutch schools.

However, the disadvantages of this historical interpretation became apparent. This tribal-based theory suggested that external borders were weak or non-existent and that there were clear-cut internal borders. This origins myth provided an historical premise, especially during the Second World War, for regional separatism and annexation to Germany. After 1945 the tribal paradigm lost its appeal for anthropological scholars and historians. When the accuracy of the three-tribe theme was fundamentally questioned, the theory fell out of favour.

Due to the scarcity of written sources, knowledge of this period depends to a large degree on the interpretation of archaeological data. The traditional view of a clear-cut division between Frisians in the north and coast, Franks in the south and Saxons in the east has proven historically problematic. Archeological evidence suggests dramatically different models for different regions, with demographic continuity for some parts of the country and depopulation and possible replacement in other parts, notably the coastal areas of Frisia and Holland.

The emergence of the Dutch language

The language from which Old Dutch (also sometimes called Old West Low Franconian, Old Low Franconian or Old Frankish) arose is unknown with certainty, but it is thought to be the language spoken by the Salian Franks. Even though the Franks are traditionally categorized as Weser-Rhine Germanic, Dutch has a number of Ingvaeonic characteristics and is classified by modern linguists as an Ingvaeonic language . Dutch also has a number of Old Saxon characteristics. There was a close relationship between Old Dutch, Old Saxon, Old English and Old Frisian. Because texts written in the language spoken by the Franks are almost non-existent, and Old Dutch texts scarce and fragmentary, not much is known about the development of Old Dutch. Old Dutch made the transition to Middle Dutch around 1150.

Christianization
The Christianity that arrived in the Netherlands with the Romans appears not to have died out completely (in Maastricht, at least) after the withdrawal of the Romans in about 411.

The Franks became Christians after their king Clovis I converted to Catholicism, an event which is traditionally set in 496. Christianity was introduced in the north after the conquest of Friesland by the Franks. The Saxons in the east were converted before the conquest of Saxony, and became Frankish allies.

Hiberno-Scottish and Anglo-Saxon missionaries, particularly Willibrord, Wulfram and Boniface, played an important role in converting the Frankish and Frisian peoples to Christianity by the 8th century. Boniface was martyred by the Frisians in Dokkum (754).

Frankish dominance and incorporation into the Holy Roman Empire

In the early 8th century the Frisians came increasingly into conflict with the Franks to the south, resulting in a series of wars in which the Frankish Empire eventually subjugated Frisia. In 734, at the Battle of the Boarn, the Frisians in the Netherlands were defeated by the Franks, who thereby conquered the area west of the Lauwers. The Franks then conquered the area east of the Lauwers in 785 when Charlemagne defeated Widukind.

The linguistic descendants of the Franks, the modern Dutch -speakers of the Netherlands and Flanders, seem to have broken with the endonym "Frank" around the 9th century. By this time Frankish identity had changed from an ethnic identity to a national identity, becoming localized and confined to the modern Franconia and principally to the French province of Île-de-France.

Although the people no longer referred to themselves as "Franks", the Netherlands was still part of the Frankish empire of Charlemagne. Indeed, because of the Austrasian origins of the Carolingians in the area between the Rhine and the Maas, the cities of Aachen, Maastricht, Liège and Nijmegen were at the heart of Carolingian culture. Charlemagne maintained his palatium in Nijmegen at least four times.

The Carolingian empire would eventually include France, Germany, northern Italy and much of Western Europe. In 843, the Frankish empire was divided into three parts, giving rise to West Francia in the west, East Francia in the east, and Middle Francia in the centre. Most of what is today the Netherlands became part of Middle Francia; Flanders became part of West Francia. This division was an important factor in the historical distinction between Flanders and the other Dutch-speaking areas.

Middle Francia was an ephemeral Frankish kingdom that had no historical or ethnic identity to bind its varied peoples. It was created by the Treaty of Verdun in 843, which divided the Carolingian Empire among the sons of Louis the Pious. Situated between the realms of East and West Francia, Middle Francia comprised the Frankish territory between the rivers Rhine and Scheldt, the Frisian coast of the North Sea, the former Kingdom of Burgundy (except for a western portion, later known as Bourgogne), Provence and the Kingdom of Italy.

Middle Francia fell to Lothair I, the eldest son and successor of Louis the Pious, after an intermittent civil war with his younger brothers Louis the German and Charles the Bald. In acknowledgement of Lothair's Imperial title, Middle Francia contained the imperial cities of Aachen, the residence of Charlemagne, as well as Rome. In 855, on his deathbed at Prüm Abbey, Emperor Lothair I again partitioned his realm amongst his sons. Most of the lands north of the Alps, including the Netherlands, passed to Lothair II and consecutively were named Lotharingia. After Lothair II died in 869, Lotharingia was partitioned by his uncles Louis the German and Charles the Bald in the Treaty of Meerssen in 870. Although some of the Netherlands had come under Viking control, in 870 it technically became part of East Francia, which became the Holy Roman Empire in 962.

Viking raids

In the 9th and 10th centuries, the Vikings raided the largely defenceless Frisian and Frankish towns lying on the coast and along the rivers of the Low Countries. Although Vikings never settled in large numbers in those areas, they did set up long-term bases and were even acknowledged as lords in a few cases. In Dutch and Frisian historical tradition, the trading centre of Dorestad declined after Viking raids from 834 to 863; however, since no convincing Viking archaeological evidence has been found at the site (as of 2007), doubts about this have grown in recent years.

One of the most important Viking families in the Low Countries was that of Rorik of Dorestad (based in Wieringen) and his brother the "younger Harald" (based in Walcheren), both thought to be nephews of Harald Klak. Around 850, Lothair I acknowledged Rorik as ruler of most of Friesland. And again in 870, Rorik was received by Charles the Bald in Nijmegen, to whom he became a vassal. Viking raids continued during that period. Harald's son Rodulf and his men were killed by the people of Oostergo in 873. Rorik died sometime before 882.

Buried Viking treasures consisting mainly of silver have been found in the Low Countries. Two such treasures have been found in Wieringen. A large treasure found in Wieringen in 1996 dates from around 850 and is thought perhaps to have been connected to Rorik. The burial of such a valuable treasure is seen as an indication that there was a permanent settlement in Wieringen.

Around 879, Godfrid arrived in Frisian lands as the head of a large force that terrorised the Low Countries. Using Ghent as his base, they ravaged Ghent, Maastricht, Liège, Stavelot, Prüm, Cologne, and Koblenz. Controlling most of Frisia between 882 and his death in 885, Godfrid became known to history as Godfrid, Duke of Frisia. His lordship over Frisia was acknowledged by Charles the Fat, to whom he became a vassal. Godfried was assassinated in 885, after which Gerolf of Holland assumed lordship and Viking rule of Frisia came to an end.

Viking raids of the Low Countries continued for over a century. Remains of Viking attacks dating from 880 to 890 have been found in Zutphen and Deventer. In 920, King Henry of Germany liberated Utrecht. According to a number of chronicles, the last attacks took place in the first decade of the 11th century and were directed at Tiel and/or Utrecht.

These Viking raids occurred about the same time that French and German lords were fighting for supremacy over the middle empire that included the Netherlands, so their sway over this area was weak. Resistance to the Vikings, if any, came from local nobles, who gained in stature as a result.

High and Late Middle Ages (1000–1433)

Part of the Holy Roman Empire
The German kings and emperors ruled the Netherlands in the 10th and 11th century, with the assistance of the Dukes of Lotharingia, and the bishops of Utrecht and Liège. Germany was called the Holy Roman Empire after the coronation of King Otto the Great as emperor. The Dutch city of Nijmegen used to be the spot of an important domain of the German emperors. Several German emperors were born and died there, including for example Byzantine empress Theophanu, who died in Nijmegen. Utrecht was also an important city and trading port at the time.

Political disunity

The Holy Roman Empire was not able to maintain political unity. In addition to the growing independence of the towns, local rulers turned their counties and duchies into private kingdoms and felt little sense of obligation to the emperor who reigned over large parts of the nation in name only. Large parts of what now comprise the Netherlands were governed by the Count of Holland, the Duke of Gelre, the Duke of Brabant and the Bishop of Utrecht. Friesland and Groningen in the north maintained their independence and were governed by the lower nobility.

The various feudal states were in a state of almost continual war. Gelre and Holland fought for control of Utrecht. Utrecht, whose bishop had in 1000 ruled over half of what is today the Netherlands, was marginalised as it experienced continuing difficulty in electing new bishops. At the same time, the dynasties of neighbouring states were more stable. Groningen, Drenthe and most of Gelre, which used to be part of Utrecht, became independent. Brabant tried to conquer its neighbours, but was not successful. Holland also tried to assert itself in Zeeland and Friesland, but its attempts failed.

The Frisians
The language and culture of most of the people who lived in the area that is now Holland were originally Frisian. The sparsely populated area was known as "West Friesland" (Westfriesland). A common theory states that Frankish migration from either Flanders, Utrecht or both displaced the Frisians in Holland, however no evidence has been found in support of this theory and more recent studies have suggested that Frisians from the mouth of the Rhine adopted the Franconian language, feudal system and religion, spreading this new 'Hollandic' identity northward over the centuries (The part of North Holland situated north of Alkmaar is still colloquially known as West Friesland).

The rest of Friesland in the north continued to maintain its independence during this time. It had its own institutions (collectively called the "Frisian freedom") and resented the imposition of the feudal system and the patriciate found in other European towns. They regarded themselves as allies of Switzerland. The Frisian battle cry was "better dead than a slave". They later lost their independence when they were defeated in 1498 by the German Landsknecht mercenaries of Duke Albrecht of Saxony-Meissen.

The rise of Holland

The center of power in these emerging independent territories was in the County of Holland. Originally granted as a fief to the Danish chieftain Rorik in return for loyalty to the emperor in 862, the region of Kennemara (the region around modern Haarlem) rapidly grew under Rorik's descendants in size and importance. By the early 11th century, Dirk III, Count of Holland was levying tolls on the Meuse estuary and was able to resist military intervention from his overlord, the Duke of Lower Lorraine.

In 1083, the name "Holland" first appears in a deed referring to a region corresponding more or less to the current province of South Holland and the southern half of what is now North Holland. Holland's influence continued to grow over the next two centuries. The counts of Holland conquered most of Zeeland but it was not until 1289 that Count Floris V was able to subjugate the Frisians in West Friesland (that is, the northern half of North Holland).

Expansion and growth

Around 1000 C.E. there were several agricultural developments (described sometimes as an agricultural revolution) that resulted in an increase in production, especially food production. The economy started to develop at a fast pace, and the higher productivity allowed workers to farm more land or to become tradesmen.

Draining of low-lying swampy areas and flood control was expanded significantly after 1200 CE. Before that, towns were built north of the major rivers, Utrecht, Kampen, Deventer, Zwolle, Nijmegen, and Zutphen, but with the expansion of dikes and drainage, cultivable land was created and population expanded. In this period, Holland expanded relative to the other regions. From the thirteenth century onward, the necessity of controlling water in this northern was a given, transforming the physical environment, but also requiring institutions and cooperation between areas for water management. Drainage boards (heemraadschappen) were established and the "dike count," took on responsibilities not only for water management issues, but also fiscal, policing, and judicial functions. By the end of the thirteenth century, Holland emerged in the dominant position of the northern region. 

The southern Low Countries remained highly populous and developed and was among the most highly urbanized areas in Europe. Because of the east-west flow of the Low Countries' large rivers, they were a military and political barrier between north and south. The southern Low Countries could not exert influence over the north.  This division meant that the counts of Holland became politically important in the north. Holland extended its political power over Zeeland.

Guilds were established and markets developed as production exceeded local needs. Also, the introduction of currency made trading a much easier affair than it had been before. Existing towns grew and new towns sprang into existence around monasteries and castles, and a mercantile middle class began to develop in these urban areas. Commerce and town development increased as the population grew.

The Crusades were popular in the Low Countries and drew many to fight in the Holy Land. At home, there was relative peace. Viking pillaging had stopped. Both the Crusades and the relative peace at home contributed to trade and the growth in commerce.

Cities arose and flourished, especially in Flanders and Brabant. As the cities grew in wealth and power, they started to buy certain privileges for themselves from the sovereign, including city rights, the right to self-government and the right to pass laws. In practice, this meant that the wealthiest cities became quasi-independent republics in their own right. Two of the most important cities were Bruges and Antwerp (in Flanders) which would later develop into some of the most important cities and ports in Europe.

Hook and Cod Wars

The Hook and Cod Wars were a series of wars and battles in the County of Holland between 1350 and 1490. Most of these wars were fought over the title of count of Holland, but some have argued that the underlying reason was because of the power struggle of the traders in the cities against the ruling nobility.

The Cod faction generally consisted of the more progressive cities of Holland. The Hook faction consisted for a large part of the conservative noblemen. Some of the main figures in this multi-generational conflict were William IV, Margaret, William V, William VI, Count of Holland and Hainaut, John and Philip the Good, Duke of Burgundy. But perhaps the most well known is Jacqueline, Countess of Hainaut.

The conquest of the county of Holland by the Duke Philip the Good of Burgundy was an odd affair. Leading noblemen in Holland invited the duke to conquer Holland, even though he had no historical claim to it. Some historians say that the ruling class in Holland wanted Holland to integrate with the Flemish economic system and adopt Flemish legal institutions. Europe had been wracked by many civil wars in the 14th and 15th centuries, while Flanders had grown rich and enjoyed peace.

Burgundian and Habsburg period (1433–1567)

Burgundian period

Most of what is now the Netherlands and Belgium was eventually united by the Duke of Burgundy, Phillip the Good (1396-1467). Before the Burgundian union, the Dutch identified themselves by the town they lived in, their local duchy or county or as subjects of the Holy Roman Empire. These collections of fiefs were ruled under the personal union of the House of Valois-Burgundy.

Trade in the region developed rapidly, especially in the areas of shipping and transport. The new rulers defended Dutch trading interests. Amsterdam grew and in the 15th century became the primary trading port in Europe for grain from the Baltic region. Amsterdam distributed grain to the major cities of Belgium, Northern France and England. This trade was vital to the people of the region as they could no longer produce enough grain to feed themselves. Land drainage had caused the peat of the former wetlands to reduce to a level that was too low for drainage to be maintained.

Habsburg rule from Spain

Charles V (1500–1558) was born and raised in the Flemish city of Ghent; he spoke French. Charles extended the Burgundian territory with the annexation of Tournai, Artois, Utrecht, Groningen and Guelders to create the Seventeen Provinces. The towns of the region had already been unified by Charles's Burgundian ancestors, but were nominally fiefs of either France or the Holy Roman Empire. When he was a minor, his aunt Margaret acted as regent until 1515. France relinquished its ancient claim on Flanders in 1528.

From 1515 to 1523, Charles's government in the Netherlands had to contend with the rebellion of Frisian peasants (led by Pier Gerlofs Donia and Wijard Jelckama). Gelre attempted to build up its own state in northeast Netherlands and northwest Germany. Lacking funds in the 16th century, Gelre had soldiers provide for themselves by pillaging enemy lands. These soldiers were a great menace to the Habsburg Netherlands, as when they pillaged The Hague.

The dukes of Burgundy over the years through astute marriages, purchases and wars, had taken control of the Seventeen Provinces that made up the Low Countries. They are now the Netherlands in the north, the Southern Netherlands (now Belgium) in the south, and Luxemburg in the southeast. Known as the "Burgundian Circle," these lands came under the control of the Habsburg family.

Charles became the ruler in 1506, but in 1515 he left the territory to become king of Spain and later Holy Roman Emperor. Charles turned over control to regents (his close relatives), and in practice the rule over the Low Countries were exercised by the Spaniards under his authority. The provinces each had their own governments and courts, controlled by the local nobility, and their own traditions and rights ("liberties") dating back centuries. Likewise the numerous cities had their own legal rights and local governments, usually controlled by the merchants. On top of this the Spanish had imposed a somewhat centralized government, the Estates General of the Netherlands, with its own officials and courts. The Spanish officials sent by Charles ignored traditions and the Dutch nobility as well as local officials, inciting an anti-Spanish sense of nationalism which led to the Dutch Revolt. With the emergence of the Protestant Reformation, Charles—now the Emperor—was determined to crush Protestantism. Unrest began in the south, centered in the large rich metropolis of Antwerp. The Netherlands was an especially rich unit of the Spanish realm, especially after the Treaty of Cateau-Cambresis of 1559; it ended four decades of warfare between France and Spain and allowed Spain to reposition its army.

In 1548, Charles granted the Netherlands status as an entity in which many of the laws of the Holy Roman Empire became obsolete. The "Transaction of Augsburg" created the Burgundian Circle of the Holy Roman Empire, which comprised the Netherlands and Franche-Comté. A year later the Pragmatic Sanction of 1549 stated that the Seventeen Provinces could only be passed on to his heirs as a composite entity.

The Reformation

During the 16th century, the Protestant Reformation rapidly gained ground in northern Europe, especially in its Lutheran and Calvinist forms. Dutch Protestants, after initial repression, were tolerated by local authorities. By the 1560s, the Protestant community had become a significant influence in the Netherlands, although it clearly formed a minority then. In a society dependent on trade, freedom and tolerance were considered essential. Nevertheless, the Catholic rulers Charles V, and later Philip II, made it their mission to defeat Protestantism, which was considered a heresy by the Catholic Church and a threat to the stability of the whole hierarchical political system. On the other hand, the intensely moralistic Dutch Protestants insisted their Biblical theology, sincere piety and humble lifestyle was morally superior to the luxurious habits and superficial religiosity of the ecclesiastical nobility. The rulers' harsh punitive measures led to increasing grievances in the Netherlands, where the local governments had embarked on a course of peaceful coexistence. In the second half of the century, the situation escalated. Philip sent troops to crush the rebellion and make the Netherlands once more a Catholic region.

In the first wave of the Reformation, Lutheranism won over the elites in Antwerp and the South. The Spanish successfully suppressed it there, and Lutheranism only flourished in east Friesland.

The second wave of the Reformation, came in the form of Anabaptism, that was popular among ordinary farmers in Holland and Friesland. Anabaptists were socially very radical and equalitarian; they believed that the apocalypse was very near. They refused to live the old way, and began new communities, creating considerable chaos. A prominent Dutch Anabaptist was Menno Simons, who initiated the Mennonite church. The movement was allowed in the north, but never grew to a large scale.

The third wave of the Reformation, that ultimately proved to be permanent, was Calvinism. It arrived in the Netherlands in the 1540s, attracting both the elite and the common population, especially in Flanders. The Catholic Spanish responded with harsh persecution and introduced the Inquisition of the Netherlands. Calvinists rebelled. First there was the iconoclasm in 1566, which was the systematic destruction of statues of saints and other Catholic devotional depictions in churches. In 1566, William the Silent, a Calvinist, started the Eighty Years' War to liberate all Dutch of whatever religion from Catholic Spain. Blum says, "His patience, tolerance, determination, concern for his people, and belief in government by consent held the Dutch together and kept alive their spirit of revolt." The provinces of Holland and Zeeland, being mainly Calvinist by 1572, submitted to the rule of William. The other states remained almost entirely Catholic.

Prelude to war

The Netherlands was a valuable part of the Spanish Empire, especially after the Treaty of Cateau-Cambresis of 1559. This treaty ended a forty-year period of warfare between France and Spain conducted in Italy from 1521 to 1559. The Treaty of Cateau-Cambresis was somewhat of a watershed—not only for the battleground that Italy had been, but also for northern Europe. Spain had been keeping troops in the Netherlands to be ready to attack France from the north as well as from the south.

With the settlement of so many major issues between France and Spain by the Treaty of Cateau-Cambresis, there was no longer any reason to keep Spanish troops in the Netherlands. Thus, the people of the Netherlands could get on with their peacetime pursuits. As they did so they found that there was a great deal of demand for their products. Fishing had long been an important part of the economy of the Netherlands. However, now the fishing of herring alone came to occupy 2,000 boats operating out of Dutch ports. Spain, still the Dutch trader's best customer, was buying fifty large ships full of furniture and household utensils from Flanders merchants. Additionally, Dutch woolen goods were desired everywhere. The Netherlands bought and processed enough Spanish wool to sell four million florins of wool products through merchants in Bruges. So strong was the Dutch appetite for raw wool at this time that they bought nearly as much English wool as they did Spanish wool. Total commerce with England alone amounted to 24 million florins. Much of the export going to England resulted in pure profit to the Dutch because the exported items were of their own manufacture. The Netherlands was just starting to enter its "Golden Age." Brabant and Flanders were the richest and most flourishing parts of the Dutch Republic at the time. The Netherlands was one of the richest places in the world. The population reached 3 million in 1560, with 25 cities of 10,000 people or more, by far the largest urban presence in Europe; with the trading and financial center of Antwerp being especially important (population 100,000). Spain could not afford to lose this rich land, nor allow it to fall from Catholic control. Thus came 80 years of warfare.

A devout Catholic, Philip was appalled by the success of the Reformation in the Low Countries, which had led to an increasing number of Calvinists. His attempts to enforce religious persecution of the Protestants, and his centralization of government, law enforcement, and taxes, made him unpopular and led to a revolt. Fernando Alvarez de Toledo, Duke of Alba, was sent with a Spanish Army to punish the unruly Dutch in 1567.

The only opposition the Duke of Alba faced in his march across the Netherlands were the nobles, Lamoral, Count of Egmont; Philippe de Montmorency, Count of Horn and others. With the approach of Alba and the Spanish army, William the Silent of Orange fled to Germany with his three brothers and his whole family on 11 April 1567. The Duke of Alba sought to meet and negotiate with the nobles that now faced him with armies. However, when the nobles arrived in Brussels they were all arrested and Egmont and Horn were executed. Alba then revoked all the prior treaties that Margaret, the Duchess of Parma had signed with the Protestants of the Netherlands and instituted the Inquisition to enforce the decrees of the Council of Trent.

The Eighty Years' War (1568–1648)

The Dutch War for Independence from Spain is frequently called the Eighty Years' War (1568–1648). The first fifty years (1568 through 1618) were a war uniquely between Spain and the Netherlands. During the last thirty years (1618–1648) the conflict between Spain and the Netherlands was submerged in the general European War that became known as the Thirty Years' War. The seven rebellious provinces of the Netherlands were eventually united by the Union of Utrecht in 1579 and formed the Republic of the Seven United Netherlands (also known as the "United Provinces"). The Act of Abjuration or Plakkaat van Verlatinghe was signed on 26 July 1581, and was the formal declaration of independence of the northern Low Countries from the Spanish king.

William of Orange (Slot Dillenburg, 24 April 1533 – Delft, 10 July 1584), the founder of the Dutch royal family, led the Dutch during the first part of the war, following the death of Egmont and Horn in 1568. The very first years were a success for the Spanish troops. However, the Dutch countered subsequent sieges in Holland. In November and December 1572, all the citizens of Zutphen and Naarden were slaughtered by the Spanish. From 11 December that year the city of Haarlem was besieged, holding out for seven months until 13 July 1573. Oudewater was conquered by the Spanish on 7 August 1575, and most of its inhabitants were killed. Maastricht was besieged, sacked and destroyed twice in succession (in 1576 and 1579) by the Spanish.

In a war composed mostly of sieges rather than battles, Governor-General Alexander Farnese proved his mettle. His strategy was to offer generous terms for the surrender of a city: there would be no more massacres or looting; historic urban privileges were retained; there was a full pardon and amnesty; return to the Catholic Church would be gradual. The conservative Catholics in the south and east supported the Spanish. Farnese recaptured Antwerp and nearly all of what became Belgium. Most of the Dutch-speaking territory in the Netherlands was taken from Spain, but not in Flanders, which to this day remains part of Belgium. Flanders was the most radical anti-Spanish territory. Many Flemish fled to Holland, among them half of the population of Antwerp, 3/4 of Bruges and Ghent and the entire population of Nieuwpoort, Dunkerque and countryside. His successful campaign gave the Catholics control of the lower half of the Low Countries, and was part of the Catholic Counter-Reformation.

The war dragged on for another half century, but the main fighting was over. The Peace of Westphalia, signed in 1648, confirmed the independence of the United Provinces from Spain. The Dutch people started to develop a national identity since the 15th century, but they officially remained a part of the Holy Roman Empire until 1648. National identity was mainly formed by the province people came from. Holland was the most important province by far.

The Catholics in the Netherlands were an outlawed minority that had been suppressed by the Calvinists. After 1572, however, they made a striking comeback (also as part of the Catholic Counter-Reformation), setting up seminaries, reforming their Church, and sending missionaries into Protestant districts. Laity often took the lead; the Calvinist government often arrested or harassed priests who seemed too effective. Catholic numbers stabilized at about a third of the population in the Netherlands; they were strongest in the southeast.

Golden Age 

During the Eighty Years' War, the Dutch provinces became the most important trading centre of Northern Europe, replacing Flanders in this respect. At the time there was a great flowering of trade, industry, the arts and the sciences in the Netherlands: in the 17th and 18th centuries, the Dutch were arguably the most economically wealthy and scientifically advanced of all European nations. This new, officially Calvinist nation flourished culturally and economically, creating what historian Simon Schama has called an "embarrassment of riches". Speculation in the tulip trade led to a first stock market crash in 1637, but the economic crisis was soon overcome. Due to these developments the 17th century has been dubbed the Golden Age of the Netherlands.

The invention of the sawmill enabled the construction of a massive fleet of ships for worldwide trading and for defence of the republic's economic interests by military means. National industries such as shipyards and sugar refineries expanded as well.

The Dutch, traditionally able seafarers and keen mapmakers, obtained an increasingly dominant position in world trade, a position which before had been occupied by the Portuguese and Spaniards. In 1602 the Dutch East India Company (Dutch: Verenigde Oostindische Compagnie or VOC) was founded. It was the first-ever multinational corporation, financed by shares that established the first modern stock exchange. It became the world's largest commercial enterprise of the 17th century. To finance the growing trade within the region, the Bank of Amsterdam was established in 1609, the precursor to, if not the first true central bank.

Dutch ships hunted whales off Svalbard, traded spices in India and present-day Indonesia (via the Dutch East India Company) and founded colonies in New Amsterdam (now New York), South Africa and the West Indies. In addition some Portuguese colonies were conquered, namely in northeastern Brazil, Angola, Indonesia and Ceylon. In 1640 by the Dutch East India Company began a trade monopoly with Japan through the trading post on Dejima.

The Dutch also dominated trade between European countries. The Low Countries were favorably positioned on a crossing of east–west and north–south trade routes and connected to a large German hinterland through the Rhine river. Dutch traders shipped wine from France and Portugal to the Baltic lands and returned with grain destined for countries around the Mediterranean Sea. By the 1680s, an average of nearly 1000 Dutch ships entered the Baltic Sea each year. The Dutch were able to gain control of much of the trade with the nascent English colonies in North America and following the end of war with Spain in 1648, Dutch trade with that country also flourished.

Renaissance Humanism, of which Desiderius Erasmus (c. 1466–1536) was an important advocate, had also gained a firm foothold and was partially responsible for a climate of tolerance. Overall, levels of tolerance were sufficiently high to attract religious refugees from other countries, notably Jewish merchants from Portugal who brought much wealth with them. The revocation of the Edict of Nantes in France in 1685 resulted in the immigration of many French Huguenots, many of whom were shopkeepers or scientists. Still tolerance had its limits, as philosopher Baruch de Spinoza (1632–1677) would find out. Due to its climate of intellectual tolerance the Dutch Republic attracted scientists and other thinkers from all over Europe. Especially the renowned University of Leiden (established in 1575 by the Dutch stadtholder, William of Oranje, as a token of gratitude for Leiden's fierce resistance against Spain during the Eighty Years' War) became a gathering place for these people. For instance French philosopher René Descartes lived in Leiden from 1628 until 1649.

Dutch lawyers were famous for their knowledge of international law of the sea and commercial law. Hugo Grotius (1583–1645) played a leading part in the foundation of international law. Again due to the Dutch climate of tolerance, book publishers flourished. Many books about religion, philosophy and science that might have been deemed controversial abroad were printed in the Netherlands and secretly exported to other countries. Thus during the 17th century the Dutch Republic became more and more Europe's publishing house.

Christiaan Huygens (1629–1695) was a famous astronomer, physicist and mathematician. He invented the pendulum clock, which was a major step forward towards exact timekeeping. He contributed to the fields of optics. The most famous Dutch scientist in the area of optics is certainly Anton van Leeuwenhoek (1632-1723), who invented or greatly improved the microscope, He was the first to methodically study microscopic life, thus laying the foundations for the field of microbiology. Famous Dutch hydraulic engineer Jan Leeghwater (1575–1650) gained important victories in the Netherlands's eternal battle against the sea. Leeghwater added a considerable amount of land to the republic by converting several large lakes into polders, pumping all water out with windmills.

Painting was the dominant art form in 17th-century Holland. Dutch Golden Age painting followed many of the tendencies that dominated Baroque art in other parts of Europe, as with the Utrecht Caravaggisti, but was the leader in developing the subjects of still life, landscape, and genre painting. Portraiture were also popular, but history painting – traditionally the most-elevated genre struggled to find buyers. Church art was virtually non-existent, and little sculpture of any kind produced. While art collecting and painting for the open market was also common elsewhere, art historians point to the growing number of wealthy Dutch middle-class and successful mercantile patrons as driving forces in the popularity of certain pictorial subjects. Today, the best-known painters of the Dutch Golden Age are the period's most dominant figure Rembrandt, the Delft master of genre Johannes Vermeer, the innovative landscape painter Jacob van Ruisdael, and Frans Hals, who infused new life into portraiture. Some notable artistic styles and trends include Haarlem Mannerism, Utrecht Caravaggism, the School of Delft, the Leiden fijnschilders, and Dutch classicism.

Due to the thriving economy, cities expanded greatly. New town halls, weighhouses and storehouses were built. Merchants that had gained a fortune ordered a new house built along one of the many new canals that were dug out in and around many cities (for defence and transport purposes), a house with an ornamented façade that befitted their new status. In the countryside, many new castles and stately homes were built. Most of them have not survived. Starting at 1595 Reformed churches were commissioned, many of which are still landmarks today. The most famous Dutch architects of the 17th century were Jacob van Campen, Pieter Post, Pieter Vingbooms, Lieven de Key, Hendrick de Keyser. Overall, Dutch architecture, which generally combined traditional building styles with some foreign elements, did not develop to the level of painting.

The Golden Age was also an important time for developments in literature. Some of the major figures of this period were Gerbrand Adriaenszoon Bredero, Jacob Cats, Pieter Corneliszoon Hooft and Joost van den Vondel. Since Latin was the lingua franca of education, relatively few men could speak, write, and read Dutch all at the same time.

Music did not develop very much in the Netherlands since the Calvinists considered it an unnecessary extravagance, and organ music was forbidden in Reformed Church services, although it remained common at secular functions.

Dutch Empire

The Dutch in the Americas 

The Dutch West India Company was a chartered company (known as the "GWC") of Dutch merchants. On 2 June 1621, it was granted a charter for a trade monopoly in the West Indies (meaning the Caribbean) by the Republic of the Seven United Netherlands and given jurisdiction over the African slave trade, Brazil, the Caribbean, and North America. Its area of operations stretched from West Africa to the Americas, and the Pacific islands. The company became instrumental in the Dutch colonization of the Americas. The first forts and settlements in Guyana and on the Amazon River date from the 1590s. Actual colonization, with Dutch settling in the new lands, was not as common as with England and France. Many of the Dutch settlements were lost or abandoned by the end of that century, but the Netherlands managed to retain possession of Suriname and a number of Dutch Caribbean islands.

The colony was a private business venture to exploit the fur trade in beaver pelts. New Netherland was slowly settled during its first decades, partially as a result of policy mismanagement by the Dutch West India Company (WIC), and conflicts with Native Americans. During the 1650s, the colony experienced dramatic growth and became a major port for trade in the Atlantic World, tolerating a highly diverse ethnic mix. The surrender of Fort Amsterdam to the British control in 1664 was formalized in 1667, contributing to the Second Anglo–Dutch War. In 1673 the Dutch re-took the area, but later relinquished it under the 5 April 1674 Treaty of Westminster ending the Third Anglo-Dutch War.

Descendants of the original settlers played a prominent role in the history of the United States, as typified by the Roosevelt and Vanderbilt families. The Hudson Valley still boasts a Dutch heritage. The concepts of civil liberties and pluralism introduced in the province became mainstays of American political and social life.

Slave trade

Although slavery was illegal inside the Netherlands it flourished in the Dutch Empire, and helped support the economy. In 1619 The Netherlands took the lead in building large-scale slave trading between Africa and Virginia, by 1650 becoming the pre-eminent slave trading country in Europe. It was overtaken by Britain around 1700. Historians agree that in all the Dutch shipped about 550,000 African slaves across the Atlantic, about 75,000 of whom died on board before reaching their destinations. From 1596 to 1829, the Dutch traders sold 250,000 slaves in the Dutch Guianas, 142,000 in the Dutch Caribbean islands, and 28,000 in Dutch Brazil. In addition, tens of thousands of slaves, mostly from India and some from Africa, were carried to the Dutch East Indies and slaves from the East Indies to Africa and the West Indies.

The Dutch in Asia: The Dutch East India Company

The Dutch East India Company (also called the VOC) emerged in 1602, when the government gave it a monopoly to trade with Asia, mainly to Mughal India. It had many world firsts—the first multinational corporation, the first company to issue stock, and the first megacorporation, possessing quasi-governmental powers, including the ability to wage war, negotiate treaties, coin money, and establish colonial settlements.

England and France soon copied its model but could not match its record. Between 1602 and 1796 the VOC sent almost a million Europeans to work in the Asia trade on 4,785 ships. It returned over 2.5 million tons of Asian trade goods. The VOC enjoyed huge profits from its spice monopoly through most of the 17th century. The VOC was active chiefly in the Dutch East Indies, now Indonesia, where its base was Batavia (now Jakarta), which remained an important trading concern and paid an 18% annual dividend for almost 200 years; colonized parts of Taiwan between 1624–1662 and 1664–1667 and was the only western trading post in Japan, Dejima.

During the period of Proto-industrialization, the empire received 50% of textile and 80% of silk imports from the Mughal Empire, chiefly from its most developed region known as the Bengal Subah.

By the 17th century, the Dutch East India Company established their base in parts of Ceylon (modern-day Sri Lanka). Afterward, they established ports in Dutch occupied Malabar, leading to Dutch settlements and trading posts in India. However, their expansion into India was halted, after their defeat in the Battle of Colachel by the Kingdom of Travancore, during the Travancore-Dutch War. The Dutch never recovered from the defeat and no longer posed a large colonial threat to India.

Eventually, the 18th century saw the Dutch East India Company weighted down by corruption, and the VOC eventually went bankrupt in 1800. Its possessions were taken over by the government and turned into the Dutch East Indies.

The Dutch in Africa 

In 1647, a Dutch vessel was wrecked in the present-day Table Bay at Cape Town. The marooned crew, the first Europeans to attempt settlement in the area, built a fort and stayed for a year until they were rescued. Shortly thereafter, the Dutch East India Company (in the Dutch of the day: Vereenigde Oostindische Compagnie, or VOC) decided to establish a permanent settlement. The VOC, one of the major European trading houses sailing the spice route to East Asia, had no intention of colonizing the area, instead wanting only to establish a secure base camp where passing ships could shelter, and where hungry sailors could stock up on fresh supplies of meat, fruit, and vegetables. To this end, a small VOC expedition under the command of Jan van Riebeeck reached Table Bay on 6 April 1652.

To remedy a labour shortage, the VOC released a small number of VOC employees from their contracts and permitted them to establish farms with which they would supply the VOC settlement from their harvests. This arrangement proved highly successful, producing abundant supplies of fruit, vegetables, wheat, and wine; they also later raised livestock. The small initial group of "free burghers", as these farmers were known, steadily increased in number and began to expand their farms further north and east.

The majority of burghers had Dutch ancestry and belonged to the Calvinist Reformed Church of the Netherlands, but there were also numerous Germans as well as some Scandinavians. In 1688 the Dutch and the Germans were joined by French Huguenots, also Calvinists, who were fleeing religious persecution in France under King Louis XIV. The Huguenots in South Africa were absorbed into the Dutch population but they played a prominent role in South Africa's history.

From the beginning, the VOC used the cape as a place to supply ships travelling between the Netherlands and the Dutch East Indies. There was a close association between the cape and these Dutch possessions in the far east. Van Riebeeck and the VOC began to import large numbers of slaves, primarily from Madagascar and Indonesia. These slaves often married Dutch settlers, and their descendants became known as the Cape Coloureds and the Cape Malays.

During the 18th century, the Dutch settlement in the area of the cape grew and prospered. By the late 1700s, the Cape Colony was one of the best developed European settlements outside Europe or the Americas. The two bases of the Cape Colony's economy for almost the entirety of its history were shipping and agriculture. Its strategic position meant that almost every ship sailing between Europe and Asia stopped off at the colony's capital Cape Town. The supplying of these ships with fresh provisions, fruit, and wine provided a very large market for the surplus produce of the colony.

Some free burghers continued to expand into the rugged hinterlands of the north and east, many began to take up a semi-nomadic pastoralist lifestyle, in some ways not far removed from that of the Khoikhoi they had displaced. In addition to its herds, a family might have a wagon, a tent, a Bible, and a few guns. As they became more settled, they would build a mud-walled cottage, frequently located, by choice, days of travel from the nearest European settlement. These were the first of the Trekboers (Wandering Farmers, later shortened to Boers), completely independent of official controls, extraordinarily self-sufficient, and isolated from the government and the main settlement in Cape Town.

Dutch was the official language, but a dialect had formed that was quite distinct from Dutch. The Afrikaans language originated mainly from 17th-century Dutch dialects.

This Dutch dialect sometimes referred to as the "kitchen language" (kombuistaal), would eventually in the late 19th century be recognised as a distinct language called Afrikaans and replace Dutch as the official language of the Afrikaners.

As the 18th century drew to a close, Dutch mercantile power began to fade and the British moved in to fill the vacuum. They seized the Cape Colony in 1795 to prevent it from falling into French hands, then briefly relinquished it back to the Dutch (1803), before definitively conquering it in 1806. British sovereignty of the area was recognised at the Congress of Vienna in 1815. By the time the Dutch colony was seized by the British in 1806, it had grown into an established settlement with 25,000 slaves, 20,000 white colonists, 15,000 Khoisan, and 1,000 freed black slaves. Outside Cape Town and the immediate hinterland, isolated black and white pastoralists populated the country.

Dutch interest in South Africa was based chiefly on the strategically located VOC port. Yet in the 17th and 18th centuries the Dutch created the foundation of the modern state of South Africa. The Dutch legacy in South Africa is evident everywhere, but particularly in the Afrikaner people and the Afrikaans language.

Dutch Republic: Regents and Stadholders (1649–1784)

The Netherlands gained independence from Spain as a result of the Eighty Years' War, during which the Dutch Republic was founded. As the Netherlands was a republic, it was largely governed by an aristocracy of city-merchants called the regents, rather than by a king. Every city and province had its own government and laws, and a large degree of autonomy. After attempts to find a competent sovereign proved unsuccessful, it was decided that sovereignty would be vested in the various provincial Estates, the governing bodies of the provinces. The Estates-General, with its representatives from all the provinces, would decide on matters important to the Republic as a whole. However, at the head of each province was the stadtholder of that province, a position held by a descendant of the House of Orange. Usually the stadtholdership of several provinces was held by a single man.

After having gained its independence in 1648, the Netherlands tried in various coalitions to help to contain France, which had replaced Spain as the strongest nation of Europe. The end of the War of the Spanish Succession (1713) marked the end of the Dutch Republic as a major player. In the 18th century, it just tried to maintain its independence and stuck to a policy of neutrality.

The economy, based on Amsterdam's role as the center of world trade, remained robust. In 1670 the Dutch merchant marine totalled 568,000 tons of shipping—about half the European total. The province of Holland was highly commercial and dominated the country. Its nobility was small and closed and had little influence, for it was numerically small, politically weak, and formed a strictly closed caste. Most land in the province of Holland was commercialized for cash crops and was owned by urban capitalists, not nobles; there were few links between Holland's nobility and the merchants. By 1650 the burgher families which had grown wealthy through commerce and become influential in government controlled the province of Holland, and to a large extent shaped national policies. The other six provinces were more rural and traditional in life style, had an active nobility, and played a small role in commerce and national politics. Instead they concentrated on their flood protections and land reclamation projects.

Refugees
The Netherlands sheltered many notable refugees, including Protestants from Antwerp and Flanders, Portuguese and German Jews, French Protestants (Huguenots) (including Descartes) and English Dissenters (including the Pilgrim Fathers). Many immigrants came to the cities of Holland in the 17th and 18th century from the Protestant parts of Germany and elsewhere. The amount of first generation immigrants from outside the Netherlands in Amsterdam was nearly 50% in the 17th and 18th centuries. Indeed, Amsterdam's population consisted primarily of immigrants, if one includes second and third generation immigrants and migrants from the Dutch countryside. People in most parts of Europe were poor and many were unemployed. But in Amsterdam there was always work. Tolerance was important, because a continuous influx of immigrants was necessary for the economy. Travellers visiting Amsterdam reported their surprise at the lack of control over the influx.

Economic growth

The era of explosive economic growth is roughly coterminous with the period of social and cultural bloom that has been called the Dutch Golden Age, and that actually formed the material basis for that cultural era. Amsterdam became the hub of world trade, the center into which staples and luxuries flowed for sorting, processing, and distribution, and then reexported around Europe and the world.

During 1585 through 1622 there was the rapid accumulation of trade capital, often brought in by refugee merchants from Antwerp and other ports. The money was typically invested in high-risk ventures like pioneering expeditions to the East Indies to engage in the spice trade. These ventures were soon consolidated in the Dutch East India Company (VOC). There were similar ventures in different fields however, like the trade on Russia and the Levant. The profits of these ventures were ploughed back in the financing of new trade, which led to its exponential growth.

Rapid industrialization led to the rapid growth of the nonagricultural labor force and the increase in real wages during the same time. In the half-century between 1570 and 1620 this labor supply increased 3 percent per annum, a truly phenomenal growth. Despite this, nominal wages were repeatedly increased, outstripping price increases. In consequence, real wages for unskilled laborers were 62 percent higher in 1615–1619 than in 1575–1579.

Amsterdam

By the mid-1660s Amsterdam had reached the optimum population (about 200,000) for the level of trade, commerce and agriculture then available to support it. The city contributed the largest quota in taxes to the States of Holland which in turn contributed over half the quota to the States General. Amsterdam was also one of the most reliable in settling tax demands and therefore was able to use the threat to withhold such payments to good effect.

Amsterdam was governed by a body of regents, a large, but closed, oligarchy with control over all aspects of the city's life, and a dominant voice in the foreign affairs of Holland. Only men with sufficient wealth and a long enough residence within the city could join the ruling class. The first step for an ambitious and wealthy merchant family was to arrange a marriage with a long-established regent family. In the 1670s one such union, that of the Trip family (the Amsterdam branch of the Swedish arms makers) with the son of Burgomaster Valckenier, extended the influence and patronage available to the latter and strengthened his dominance of the council. The oligarchy in Amsterdam thus gained strength from its breadth and openness. In the smaller towns family interest could unite members on policy decisions but contraction through intermarriage could lead to the degeneration of the quality of the members.

In Amsterdam the network was so large that members of the same family could be related to opposing factions and pursue widely separated interests. The young men who had risen to positions of authority in the 1670s and 1680s consolidated their hold on office well into the 1690s and even the new century.

Amsterdam's regents provided good services to residents. They spent heavily on the water-ways and other essential infrastructure, as well as municipal almshouses for the elderly, hospitals and churches.

Amsterdam's wealth was generated by its commerce, which was in turn sustained by the judicious encouragement of entrepreneurs whatever their origin. This open door policy has been interpreted as proof of a tolerant ruling class. But toleration was practiced for the convenience of the city. Therefore, the wealthy Sephardic Jews from Portugal were welcomed and accorded all privileges except those of citizenship, but the poor Ashkenazi Jews from Eastern Europe were far more carefully vetted and those who became dependent on the city were encouraged to move on. Similarly, provision for the housing of Huguenot immigrants was made in 1681 when Louis XIV's religious policy was beginning to drive these Protestants out of France; no encouragement was given to the dispossessed Dutch from the countryside or other towns of Holland. The regents encouraged immigrants to build churches and provided sites or buildings for churches and temples for all except the most radical sects and the Catholics by the 1670s (although even the Catholics could practice quietly in a chapel within the Beguinhof).

First Stadtholderless Period (1650–1675)

During the wars a tension had arisen between the Orange-Nassau leaders and the patrician merchants. The former—the Orangists—were soldiers and centralizers who seldom spoke of compromise with the enemy and looked for military solutions. They included many rural gentry as well as ordinary folk attached to the banner of the House of Orange. The latter group were the Republicans, led by the Grand Pensionary (a sort of prime minister) and the regents stood for localism, municipal rights, commerce, and peace. In 1650, the stadtholder William II, Prince of Orange suddenly died; his son was a baby and the Orangists were leaderless. The regents seized the opportunity: there would be no new stadtholder in Holland for 22 years. Johan de Witt, a brilliant politician and diplomat, emerged as the dominant figure. Princes of Orange became the stadtholder and an almost hereditary ruler in 1672 and 1748. The Dutch Republic of the United Provinces was a true republic from 1650 to 1672 and 1702–1748. These periods are called the First Stadtholderless Period and Second Stadtholderless Period.

First and Second Anglo-Dutch wars

The Republic and England were major rivals in world trade and naval power. Halfway through the 17th century the Republic's navy was the rival of Britain's Royal Navy as the most powerful navy in the world. The Republic fought a series of three naval wars against England in 1652–1674.

In 1651, England imposed its first Navigation Act, which severely hurt Dutch trade interests. An incident at sea concerning the Act resulted in the First Anglo-Dutch War, which lasted from 1652 to 1654, ending in the Treaty of Westminster (1654), which left the Navigation Act in effect.

After the English Restoration in 1660, Charles II tried to serve his dynastic interests by attempting to make Prince William III of Orange, his nephew, stadtholder of the Republic, using some military pressure. King Charles thought a naval war would weaken the Dutch traders and strengthen the English economy and empire, so the Second Anglo-Dutch War was launched in 1665. At first many Dutch ships were captured and the English scored great victories. However, the Raid on the Medway, in June 1667, ended the war with a Dutch victory. The Dutch recovered their trade, while the English economy was seriously hurt and its treasury nearly bankrupt. The greatly expanded Dutch navy was for years after the world's strongest. The Dutch Republic was at the zenith of its power.

Franco-Dutch War and Third Anglo-Dutch War (1672–1702)

The year 1672 is known in the Netherlands as the "Disaster Year" (Rampjaar). England declared war on the Republic, (the Third Anglo-Dutch War), followed by France, Münster and Cologne, which had all signed alliances against the Republic. France, Cologne and Münster invaded the Republic. Johan de Witt and his brother Cornelis, who had accomplished a diplomatic balancing act for a long time, were now the obvious scapegoats. They were lynched, and a new stadtholder, William III, was appointed.

An Anglo-French attempt to land on the Dutch shore was barely repelled in three desperate naval battles under command of Admiral Michiel de Ruyter. The advance of French troops from the south was halted by a costly inundation of its own heartland, by breaching river dikes. With the aid of friendly German princes, the Dutch succeeded in fighting back Cologne and Münster, after which the peace was signed with both of them, although some territory in the east was lost forever. Peace was signed with England as well, in 1674 (Second Treaty of Westminster). In 1678, peace was made with France at the Treaty of Nijmegen, although France's Spanish and German allies felt betrayed by this.

In 1688, the relations with England reached crisis level once again. Stadtholder William III decided he had to take a huge gamble when he was invited to invade England by Protestant British nobles feuding with William's father-in-law the Catholic James II of England. This led to the Glorious Revolution and cemented the principle of parliamentary rule and Protestant ascendency in England. James fled to France, and William ascended to the English throne as co-monarch with his wife Mary, James' eldest daughter. This manoeuvre secured England as a critical ally of the United Provinces in its ongoing wars with Louis XIV of France. William was the commander of the Dutch and English armies and fleets until his death in 1702. During William's reign as King of England, his primary focus was leveraging British manpower and finances to aid the Dutch against the French. The combination continued after his death as the combined Dutch, British, and mercenary army conquered Flanders and Brabant, and invaded French territory before the alliance collapsed in 1713 due to British political infighting.

Second Stadtholderless Period (1702–1747)

The Second Stadtholderless Period is the designation in Dutch historiography of the period between the death of stadtholder William III on 19 March 1702 and the appointment of William IV, Prince of Orange as stadtholder and captain general in all provinces of the Dutch Republic on 2 May 1747. During this period the office of stadtholder was left vacant in the provinces of Holland, Zeeland, and Utrecht, though in other provinces that office was filled by members of the House of Nassau-Dietz (later called Orange-Nassau) during various periods.

During the period, the Republic lost its Great-Power status and its primacy in world trade, processes that went hand-in-hand, the latter causing the former. Though the economy declined considerably, causing deindustralization and deurbanization in the maritime provinces, a rentier-class kept accumulating a large capital fund that formed the basis for the leading position the Republic achieved in the international capital market. A military crisis at the end of the period caused the fall of the States-Party regime and the restoration of the Stadtholderate in all provinces. However, though the new stadtholder acquired near-dictatorial powers, this did not improve the situation.

Economic decline after 1730
The slow economic decline after 1730 was relative: other countries grew faster, eroding the Dutch lead and surpassing it. Wilson identifies three causes. Holland lost its world dominance in trade as competitors emerged and copied its practices, built their own ships and ports, and traded on their own account directly without going through Dutch intermediaries. Second, there was no growth in manufacturing, due perhaps to a weaker sense of industrial entrepreneurship and to the high wage scale. Third the wealthy turned their investments to foreign loans. This helped jump-start other nations and provided the Dutch with a steady income from collecting interest, but leaving them with few domestic sectors with a potential for rapid growth.

After the Dutch fleet declined, merchant interests became dependent on the goodwill of Britain. The main focus of Dutch leaders was reducing the country's considerable budget deficits. Dutch trade and shipping remained at a fairly steady level through the 18th century, but no longer had a near monopoly and also could not match growing English and French competition. The Netherlands lost its position as the trading centre of Northern Europe to London.

Although the Netherlands remained wealthy, investors for the nation's money became more difficult to find. Some investment went into purchases of land for estates, but most went to foreign bonds and Amsterdam remained one of Europe's banking capitals.

Culture and society
Dutch culture also declined both in the arts and sciences. Literature for example largely imitated English and French styles with little in the way of innovation or originality. The most influential intellectual was Pierre Bayle (1647–1706), a Protestant refugee from France who settled in Rotterdam where he wrote the massive Dictionnaire Historique et Critique (Historical and Critical Dictionary, 1696). It had a major impact on the thinking of The Enlightenment across Europe, giving an arsenal of weapons to critics who wanted to attack religion. It was an encyclopaedia of ideas that argued that most "truths" were merely opinions, and that gullibility and stubbornness were prevalent.

Religious life became more relaxed as well. Catholics grew from 18% to 23% of the population during the 18th century and enjoyed greater tolerance, even as they continued to be outside the political system. They became divided by the feud between moralistic Jansenists (who denied free will) and orthodox believers. One group of Jansenists formed a splinter sect, the Old Catholic Church in 1723. The upper classes willingly embraced the ideas of the Enlightenment, tempered by the tolerance that meant less hostility to organized religion compared to France.

Dutch universities declined in importance, no longer attracting large numbers of foreign students. The Netherlands remained an important hub of intellectual exchange, creating reviews of foreign publications that made scholars aware of new works in French, German, and English.  Dutch painting declined, no longer being innovative, with painters pursuing the styles of the old masters.   

Life for the average Dutchman became slower and more relaxed in the 18th century. The upper and middle classes continued to enjoy prosperity and high living standards. The drive to succeed seemed less urgent. Unskilled laborers remained locked in poverty and hardship. The large underclass of unemployed required government and private charity to survive.

The Orangist revolution (1747–1751)

During the term of Anthonie van der Heim as Grand Pensionary from 1737 to 1746, the Republic slowly drifted into the War of Austrian Succession. This started as a Prusso-Austrian conflict, but eventually all the neighbours of the Dutch Republic became involved. On one side were Prussia, France and their allies and on the other Austria, Britain (after 1744) and their allies. At first the Republic strove to remain neutral in this European conflict, but it maintained garrisons in a number of fortresses in the Austrian Netherlands. French grievances and threats spurred the Republic into bring its army up to European standards (84,000 men in 1743)

In 1744 and 1745 the French attacked Dutch fortresses at Menen and Tournai. This prompted the Dutch Republic in 1745 to join the Quadruple Alliance, but this alliance was severely defeated at the Battle of Fontenoy in May 1745. In 1746 the French occupied most of the large cities in the Austrian Netherlands. Then, in April 1747, apparently as an exercise in armed diplomacy, a relatively small French military force occupied Zeelandic Flanders, part of the Dutch Republic.

This relatively innocuous invasion fully exposed the rot underlying the Dutch defences. The consequences were spectacular. Still mindful of the French invasion in the "Disaster Year" of 1672, many fearful people clamored for the restoration of the stadtholderate. William IV, Prince of Orange, had been waiting impatiently in the wings since acquiring his princely title in 1732. Over the next year he and his supporters engaged in a number of political battles in various provinces and towns in the Netherlands to wrest control from the regents. The aim was for William IV to obtain a firm grip on government patronage and place loyal officials in all strategic government positions. Eventually he managed to achieve this aim in all provinces.

Willem Bentinck van Rhoon was a prominent Orangist. People like Bentinck hoped that gathering the reins of power in the hands of a single "eminent head" would soon help restore the state of the Dutch economy and finances. The regents they opposed included the Grand Pensionary Jacob Gilles and Adriaen van der Hoop. This popular revolt had religious, anti-Catholic and democratic overtones and sometimes involved mob violence. It eventually involved political agitation by Daniel Raap, Jean Rousset de Missy and the Doelisten, attacks on tax farmers (pachtersoproer), religious agitation for enforcement of the Sabbath laws and preference for followers of Gisbertus Voetius and various demands by the civil militia.

The war against the French was itself brought to a not-too-devastating end for the Dutch Republic with the Treaty of Aix-la-Chapelle (1748). The French retreated of their own accord from the Dutch frontier. William IV died unexpectedly, at the age of 40, on 22 October 1751.

Regency and indolent rule (1752–1779)
His son, William V, was 3 years old when his father died, and a long regency characterised by corruption and misrule began. His mother delegated most of the powers of the regency to Bentinck and her favorite, Duke Louis Ernest of Brunswick-Lüneburg. All power was concentrated in the hands of an unaccountable few, including the Frisian nobleman Douwe Sirtema van Grovestins. Still a teenager, William V assumed the position of stadtholder in 1766, the last to hold that office. In 1767, he married Princess Wilhelmina of Prussia, the daughter of Augustus William of Prussia, niece of Frederick the Great.

The position of the Dutch during the American War of Independence (1775-1783) was one of neutrality. William V, leading the pro-British faction within the government, blocked attempts by pro-independence, and later pro-French, elements to drag the government to war. However, things came to a head with the Dutch attempt to join the Russian-led League of Armed Neutrality, leading to the outbreak of the disastrous Fourth Anglo-Dutch War in 1780. After the signing of the Treaty of Paris (1783), the impoverished nation grew restless under William's rule.

An English historian summed him up uncharitably as "a Prince of the profoundest lethargy and most abysmal stupidity." And yet he would guide his family through the difficult French-Batavian period and his son would be crowned king.

Fourth Anglo-Dutch War (1780–1784)

The Fourth Anglo–Dutch War (1780–1784) was a conflict between the Kingdom of Great Britain and the Dutch Republic. The war, tangentially related to the American Revolutionary War, broke out over British and Dutch disagreements on the legality and conduct of Dutch trade with Britain's enemies in that war.

Although the Dutch Republic did not enter into a formal alliance with the United States and their allies, U.S. ambassador (and future President) John Adams managed to establish diplomatic relations with the Dutch Republic, making it the second European country to diplomatically recognize the Continental Congress in April 1782. In October 1782, a treaty of amity and commerce was concluded as well.

Most of the war consisted of a series of largely successful British operations against Dutch colonial economic interests, although British and Dutch naval forces also met once off the Dutch coast. The war ended disastrously for the Dutch and exposed the weakness of the political and economic foundations of the country. The Treaty of Paris (1784), according to Fernand Braudel, "sounded the knell of Dutch greatness."

The French-Batavian period (1785–1815)
After the war with Great Britain ended disastrously in 1784, there was growing unrest and a rebellion by the anti-Orangist Patriots. The French Revolution resulted first in the establishment of a pro-French Batavian Republic (1795–1806), then the creation of the Kingdom of Holland, ruled by a member of the House of Bonaparte (1806–1810), and finally annexation by the French Empire (1810–1813).

Patriot rebellion and its suppression (1785–1795)

Influenced by the American Revolution, the Patriots sought a more democratic form of government. The opening shot of this revolution is often considered to be the 1781 publication of a manifesto called Aan het Volk van Nederland ("To the People of the Netherlands") by Joan van der Capellen tot den Pol, who would become an influential leader of the Patriot movement. Their aim was to reduce corruption and the power held by the stadtholder, William V, Prince of Orange.

Support for the Patriots came mostly from the middle class. They formed militias called exercitiegenootschappen. In 1785, there was an open Patriot rebellion, which took the form of an armed insurrection by local militias in certain Dutch towns, Freedom being the rallying cry. Herman Willem Daendels attempted to organise an overthrow of various municipal governments (vroedschap). The goal was to oust government officials and force new elections. "Seen as a whole this revolution was a string of violent and confused events, accidents, speeches, rumours, bitter enmities and armed confrontations", wrote French historian Fernand Braudel, who saw it as a forerunner of the French Revolution. The Patriot movement focused more on local political power, where they had no say in their towns' governance. Although they were able to curtail the power of the stadholder, and hold democratic elections in select towns, they were divided in their political vision, which was more local than national. Supporters were drawn from religious dissenters and Catholics in particular places, while pro-stadholder Orangists had more widespread geographical support of sections of the lower classes, the Dutch Reformed clergy, and the Jewish community. 

In 1785 the stadholder left The Hague and moved his court to Nijmegen in Guelders, a city remote from the heart of Dutch political life. In June 1787, his energetic wife Wilhelmina (the sister of Frederick William II of Prussia) tried to travel to The Hague. Outside Schoonhoven, she was stopped by Patriot militiamen and taken to a farm near Goejanverwellesluis. She was forced to return to Nijmegen. She appealed to her brother for help, and he sent some 26,000 troops to invade, led by Charles William Ferdinand, Duke of Brunswick and a small contingent of British troops to suppress the rebellion. The Patriot militias could not contend with these forces, melting away. Dutch banks at this time still held much of the world's capital. Government-sponsored banks owned up to 40% of Great Britain's national debt and there were close connections to the House of Stuart. The stadholder had supported British policies after the American Revolution and in foreign policy, the stadholder was "little more than a pawn of the British and Prussians", so that Patriot pressure was ignored by William. 

This severe military response overwhelmed the Patriots and put the stadholder firmly back in control. A small unpaid Prussian army was billeted in the Netherlands and supported themselves by looting and extortion. The exercitiegenootschappen continued urging citizens to resist the government. They distributed pamphlets, formed "Patriot Clubs" and held public demonstrations. The government responded by pillaging those towns where opposition continued. Five leaders were sentenced to death, forcing them to flee. Lynchings also occurred. For a while, no one dared appear in public without an orange cockade to show their support for Orangism. Many Patriots, perhaps around 40,000 in all, fled to Brabant, France (especially Dunkirk and St. Omer) and elsewhere. Before long the French became involved in Dutch politics and the tide turned toward the Patriots.

Batavian Republic (1795–1806)

The French Revolution was popular, and numerous underground clubs were promoting it when in January 1795 the French army invaded. The underground rose up, overthrew the municipal and provincial governments, and proclaimed the Batavian Republic in Amsterdam. Stadtholder William V fled to England and the States General dissolved itself. The new government was virtually a puppet of France. The Batavian Republic enjoyed widespread support and sent soldiers to fight in the French armies. The 1799 Anglo-Russian invasion of Holland was repulsed by Batavian–French forces. Nevertheless, Napoleon replaced it because the regime of Grand Pensionary Rutger Jan Schimmelpenninck (1805–1806) was insufficiently docile.

The confederal structure of the old Dutch Republic was permanently replaced by a unitary state. The 1798 constitution had a genuinely democratic character, though a coup d'état of 1801 put an authoritarian regime in power. Ministerial government was introduced for the first time in Dutch history and many of the current government departments date their history back to this period. Meanwhile, the exiled stadholder handed over the Dutch colonies in "safekeeping" to Great Britain and ordered the colonial governors to comply. This permanently ended the colonial empire in Guyana, Ceylon and the Cape Colony. The Dutch East Indies was returned to the Netherlands under the Anglo-Dutch Treaty of 1814.

Kingdom of Holland to William I (1806–1815)

In 1806 Napoleon transformed the Netherlands (along with a small part of what is now Germany) into the Kingdom of Holland, putting his brother Louis Bonaparte (1778–1846), on the throne. The new king was unpopular, but he was willing to cross his brother for the benefit of his new kingdom. Napoleon forced his abdication in 1810 and incorporated the Netherlands directly into the French empire, imposing economic controls and conscription of all young men as soldiers. When the French retreated from the northern provinces in 1813, a Triumvirate took over at the helm of a provisional government. Although most members of the provisional government had been among the men who had driven out William V 18 years earlier, the leaders of the provisional government knew that any new regime would have to be headed by his son, William Frederick. They also knew that it would be better in the long term if the Dutch people themselves installed the prince, rather than have him imposed on the country by the anti-French alliance. Accordingly, the Triumvirate called William Frederick back on 30 November and offered him the crown. He refused, but instead proclaimed himself "hereditary sovereign prince" on 6 December.

The Great Powers had secretly agreed to merge the northern Netherlands with the more populated Austrian Netherlands and the smaller Prince-Bishopric of Liège into a single constitutional monarchy. Having a stronger country on France's northern border was considered (especially by Tsar Alexander) to be an important part of the strategy to keep France's power in check. In 1814, William Frederick gained sovereignty over the Austrian Netherlands and Liège as well. Thus, William Frederick had fulfilled his family's three-century quest to unite the Low Countries under a single rule.

On 15 March 1815; with the encouragement of the powers gathered at the Congress of Vienna, William Frederick raised the Netherlands to the status of a kingdom and proclaimed himself King William I. This was made official later in 1815, when the Low Countries were formally recognized as the United Kingdom of the Netherlands. The crown was made a hereditary office of the House of Orange-Nassau.

United Kingdom of the Netherlands (1815–1839)

William I became king and also became the hereditary Grand Duke of Luxembourg, that was part of the Netherlands but at the same time part of the German Confederation. The newly created country had two capitals: Amsterdam and Brussels. The new nation had two equal parts. The north (Netherlands proper) had 2 million people. They spoke chiefly Dutch but were divided religiously between a Protestant majority and a large Catholic minority. The south (which would be known as "Belgium" after 1830) had a population of 3.4 million people. Nearly all were Catholic, but it was divided between French-speaking Walloons and Dutch-speaking Flemings. The upper and middle classes in the south were mostly French-speaking. About 60,000 Belgians were eligible to vote, compared to about 80,000 Dutchmen. Officially Amsterdam was the capital, but in a compromise the government met alternately in Brussels and The Hague.

Adolphe Quetelet (1796–1874), the great Belgian statistician, calculated that the new nation was significantly better off than other states. Mortality was low, the food supply was good, education was good, public awareness was high and the charity rate was the highest in the world. The best years were in the mid-1820s.

The quality of schooling was dismal, however. According to Schama, about 1800 the local school teacher was the "humble auxiliary of the local priest. Despised by his co-villagers and forced to subsist on the gleanings of the peasants, he combined drumming the catechism into the heads of his unruly charges with the duties of winding the town clock, ringing the church bells or digging its graves. His principal use to the community was to keep its boys out of mischief when there was no labour for them in the fields, or setting the destitute orphans of the town to the 'useful arts' of picking tow or spinning crude flax. As one would expect, standards in such an occupation were dismal." But in 1806 the Dutch, led by Adriaan van den Ende, energetically set out to modernise education, focusing on a new system for advanced training of teachers with an elaborate system of inspectors, training courses, teacher examinations and teaching societies. By 1826, although much smaller than France, the Dutch national government was spending 12 times more than Paris on education.

Constitutional monarchy

William I, who reigned from 1815 to 1840, had great constitutional power. An enlightened despot, he accepted the modernizing transformations of the previous 25 years, including equality of all before the law. However, he resurrected the estates as a political class and elevated a large number of people to the nobility. Voting rights were still limited, and only the nobility were eligible for seats in the upper house. The old provinces were reestablished in name only. The government was now fundamentally unitary, and all authority flowed from the center.

William I was a Calvinist and unsympathetic to the religious culture and practices of the Catholic majority. He promulgated the "Fundamental Law of Holland", with some modifications. This entirely overthrew the old order of things in the southern Netherlands: it abolished the privileges of the Catholic Church, and guaranteed equal protection to every religious creed and the enjoyment of the same civil and political rights to every subject of the king. It reflected the spirit of the French Revolution and in so doing did not please the Catholic bishops in the south, who had detested the Revolution.

William I actively promoted economic modernization. The first 15 years of the Kingdom showed progress and prosperity, as industrialization proceeded rapidly in the south, where the Industrial Revolution allowed entrepreneurs and labor to combine in a new textile industry, powered by local coal mines. There was little industry in the northern provinces, but most overseas colonies were restored, and highly profitable trade resumed after a 25-year hiatus. Economic liberalism combined with moderate monarchical authoritarianism accelerated the adaptation of the Netherlands to the new conditions of the 19th century. The country prospered until a crisis arose in relations with the southern provinces.

Belgium breaks away

William was determined to create a united people, even though the north and south had drifted far apart in the past three centuries. Protestants were the largest denomination in the North (population 2 million), but formed a quarter of the population in the overwhelmingly Catholic South (population 3.5 million). Nevertheless, Protestants dominated William's government and army. The Catholics did not consider themselves an integral part of the United Netherlands, preferring instead to identify with mediaeval Dutch culture. Other factors that contributed to this feeling were economic (the South was industrialising, the North had always been a merchants' nation) and linguistic (French was spoken in Wallonia and a large part of the bourgeoisie in Flemish cities).

After having been dominant for centuries, the French-speaking elite in the Southern Netherlands now felt like second-class citizens.
In the Catholic South, William's policies were unpopular. The French-speaking Walloons strenuously rejected his attempt to make Dutch the universal language of government, while the population of Flanders was divided. Flemings in the south spoke a Dutch dialect ("Flemish") and welcomed the encouragement of Dutch with a revival of literature and popular culture. Other Flemings, notably the educated bourgeoisie, preferred to speak French. Although Catholics possessed legal equality, they resented their subordination to a government that was fundamentally Protestant in spirit and membership after having been the state church for centuries in the south. Few Catholics held high office in state or army. Furthermore, political liberals in the south complained about the king's authoritarian methods. All southerners complained of underrepresentation in the national legislature. Although the south was industrializing and was more prosperous than the north the accumulated grievances allowed the multiple opposition forces to coalesce.

The outbreak of revolution in France in 1830 was a signal for action, at first on behalf of autonomy for Belgium, as the southern provinces were now called, and later on behalf of total independence. William dithered and his half-hearted efforts to reconquer Belgium were thwarted both by the efforts of the Belgians themselves and by the diplomatic opposition of the great powers.

At the London Conference of 1830, the chief powers of Europe ordered (in November 1830) an armistice between the Dutch and the Belgians. The first draft for a treaty of separation of Belgium and the Netherlands was rejected by the Belgians. A second draft (June 1831) was rejected by William I, who resumed hostilities. Franco-British intervention forced William to withdraw Dutch forces from Belgium late in 1831, and in 1833 an armistice of indefinite duration was concluded. Belgium was effectively independent but William's attempts to recover Luxembourg and Limburg led to renewed tension. The London Conference of 1838–1839 prepared the final Dutch-Belgian separation treaty of 1839. It divided Luxembourg and Limburg between the Dutch and Belgian crowns. The Kingdom of the Netherlands thereafter was made up of the 11 northern provinces.

Democratic and Industrial Development (1840–1900)

The Netherlands did not industrialize as rapidly as Belgium after 1830, but it was prosperous enough. Griffiths argues that certain government policies facilitated the emergence of a national economy in the 19th century. They included the abolition of internal tariffs and guilds, a unified coinage system, modern methods of tax collection, standardized weights and measures, and the building of many roads, canals, and railroads. However, compared to Belgium, which was leading in industrialization on the Continent, the Netherlands moved slowly. Possible explanations for this difference are the higher costs due to geography and high wages, and the emphasis of entrepreneurs on trade rather than industry.
For example, in the Dutch coastal provinces agricultural productivity was relatively high. Hence, industrial growth arrived relatively late – after 1860 – because incentives to move to labour-intensive industry were quite weak.
However, the provinces of North Brabant and Overijssel did industrialize, and they became the most economically advanced areas of the country.

As in the rest of Europe, the 19th century saw the gradual transformation of the Netherlands into a modern middle-class industrial society. The number of people employed in agriculture decreased, while the country made a strong effort to revive its stake in the highly competitive shipping and trade business. The Netherlands lagged behind Belgium until the late 19th century in industrialization, and caught up around 1920. Major industries included textiles and (later) the great Philips industrial conglomerate. Rotterdam became a major shipping and manufacturing center. Poverty slowly declined as begging largely disappeared along with steadily improving working conditions for the population.

1848 Constitutional reform and liberalism

In 1840 William I abdicated in favor of his son, William II, who attempted to carry on the policies of his father in the face of a powerful liberal movement. In 1848 unrest broke out all over Europe. Although there were no major events in the Netherlands, these foreign developments persuaded King William II to agree to liberal and democratic reform. That same year Johan Rudolf Thorbecke, a prominent liberal, was asked by the king to draft a constitution that would turn the Netherlands into a constitutional monarchy. The new constitution was proclaimed on 3 November 1848. It severely limited the king's powers (making the government accountable only to an elected parliament), and it protected civil liberties. The new liberal constitution, which put the government under the control of the States General, was accepted by the legislature in 1848. The relationship between monarch, government and parliament has remained essentially unchanged ever since. In fact, the current Constitution of the Netherlands is the 1848 Constitution, albeit with amendments.

William II was succeeded by William III in 1849. The new king reluctantly chose Thorbecke to head the new government, which introduced several liberal measures, notably the extension of suffrage. However, Thorbecke's government soon fell, when Protestants rioted against the Vatican's reestablishment of the Catholic episcopate, in abeyance since the 16th century. A conservative government was formed, but it did not undo the liberal measures, and the Catholics were finally given equality after two centuries of subordination. Dutch political history from the middle of the 19th century until the First World War was fundamentally one of the extension of liberal reforms in government, the reorganization and modernization of the Dutch economy, and the rise of trade unionism and socialism as working-class movements independent of traditional liberalism. The growth in prosperity was enormous, as real per capita GNP soared from 106 guilders in 1804 to 403 in 1913.

Religion and pillarisation

Religion was a contentious issue with repeated struggles over the relations of church and state in the field of education. In 1816, the government took full control of the Dutch Reformed Church (Nederlands Hervormde Kerk). In 1857, all religious instruction was ended in public schools, but the various churches set up their own schools, and even universities. Dissident members broke away from the Dutch Reformed Church in the Secession of 1834. They were harassed by the government under an onerous Napoleonic law prohibiting gatherings of more than 20 members without a permit. After the harassment ended in the 1850s, a number of these dissidents eventually created the Christian Reformed Church in 1869; thousands migrated to Michigan, Illinois, and Iowa in the United States. By 1900, the dissidents represented about 10% of the population, compared to 45% of the population who were in the Dutch Reformed Church, which continued to be the only church to receive state money.

At mid-century, most Dutch belonged either to the Dutch Reformed Church or dissenter groups that separated from it (around 55%), or the Roman Catholic Church (35% to 40%), together with smaller Protestant (for example, Lutheran) and Jewish groups. A large and powerful sector of nominal Protestants were in fact secular liberals seeking to minimize religious influence. In reaction a novel alliance developed with Catholics and devout Calvinists joining against secular liberals. The Catholics, who had been loosely allied with the liberals in earlier decades, turned against them on the issue of state support, which the liberals insisted should be granted only to public schools, and joined with Protestant political parties in demanding equal state support to schools maintained by religious groups.

The Netherlands remained one of the most tolerant countries in Europe towards religious belief, although conservative Protestants objected to the liberalization of the Dutch Reformed Church during the 19th century and faced opposition from the government when they tried to establish separate communities (Catholics and other non-Protestants were left unmolested by Dutch authorities). Some moved to the United States as a consequence, but as the century drew to a close, religious persecution had totally ceased.

Dutch social and political life became divided by fairly clear-cut internal borders that were emerging as the society pillarized into three separate parts based on religion. The economy was not affected. One of the people most responsible for designing pillarization was Abraham Kuyper (1837–1920), a leading politician, neo-Calvinist theologian, and journalist. Kuyper established orthodox Calvinist organizations, and also provided a theoretical framework by developing such concepts as "sphere-sovereignty" that celebrated Dutch society as a society of organized minorities. Verzuiling ("pillarization" or "pluralism") after 1850 became the solution to the danger of internal conflict. Everyone was part of one (and only one) pillar (zuil) based chiefly on religion (Protestant, Catholic, secular). The secular pillar eventually split into a socialist/working class pillar and a liberal (pro-business) secular pillar. Each pillar built a full set of its own social organizations, including churches (for the religious pillars), political parties, schools, universities, labor unions, sport clubs, boy scout unions and other youth clubs, and newspapers. The members of different zuilen lived in close proximity in cities and villages, spoke the same language, and did business with one another, but seldom interacted informally and rarely intermarried. In politics Kuyper formed the Anti-Revolutionary Party (ARP) in 1879, and headed it until 1905.

Pillarization was officially recognized in the Pacification of 1917, whereby socialists and liberals achieved their goal of universal male suffrage and the religious parties were guaranteed equal funding of all schools. In 1930 radio was organized so that each pillar had full control of its own network. When television began in the late 1940s the pillars divided up time equally on the one station. In politics and civic affairs leaders of the pillar organizations cooperated and they acknowledged the right of the other pillars, so public life generally ran smoothly.

Flourishing of art, culture and science
The late 19th century saw a cultural revival. The Hague School brought a revival of realist painting, 1860–1890. The world-famous Dutch painter was Vincent van Gogh, but he spent most of his career in France. Literature, music, architecture and science also flourished. A representative leader of science was Johannes Diderik van der Waals (1837–1923), a working class youth who taught himself physics, earned a PhD at the nation's leading school Leiden University, and in 1910 won the Nobel Prize for his discoveries in thermodynamics. Hendrik Lorentz (1853–1928) and his student Pieter Zeeman (1865–1943) shared the 1902 Nobel Prize in physics. Other notable scientists included biologist Hugo de Vries (1848–1935), who rediscovered Mendelian genetics.

1900 to 1940

In 1890, William III died after a long reign and was succeeded by his young daughter, Queen Wilhelmina (1880–1962). She would rule the Netherlands for 58 years. On her accession to the throne, the personal union between the Netherlands and Luxembourg ended because Luxembourg law excluded women from rule. Her remote cousin Adolphe became the Grand Duke of Luxembourg.

This was a time of further growth and colonial development, but it was marked by the difficulties of World War I (in which the Netherlands was neutral)
and the Great Depression. The Dutch population grew rapidly in the 20th century, as death rates fell, more lands were opened up, and industrialisation created urban jobs. Between 1900 and 1950 the population doubled from 5.1 to 10 million people.

Colonial focus

The Dutch empire comprised the Dutch East Indies (Indonesia), as well as Suriname in South America and some minor possessions. The empire was run from Batavia (in Java), where the governor and his technical experts had almost complete authority with little oversight from The Hague. Successive governors improved their bureaucratic and military controls, and allowed very little voice to the locals until the 1920s.

The colony brought economic opportunity to the mother country and there was little concern at the time about it. One exception came in 1860 when Eduard Dekker, under the pen name "Multatuli" wrote the novel Max Havelaar: Or the Coffee Auctions of the Dutch Trading Company, one of the most notable books in the history of Dutch literature. He criticized the exploitation of the colony and as well had harsh words about the indigenous princes who collaborated with the governor. The book helped inspire the Indonesian independence movement in the mid-20th century as well as the "Fair trade" movement for coffee at the end of the century.

The military forces in the Dutch East Indies were controlled by the governor and were not part of the regular Dutch army. As the map shows, the Dutch slowly expanded their holdings from their base in Java to include all of modern Indonesia by 1920. Most islands were not a problem but there was a long, costly campaign against the Achin (Aceh) state in northern Sumatra.

The Netherlands had not fought a major military campaign since the 1760s, and so the strength of its armed forces had gradually dwindled. The Dutch decided not to ally themselves with anyone, and kept out of all European wars, especially the First World War but was eventually drawn into it.

Neutrality during the First World War 

The German war plan (the Schlieffen Plan) of 1905 was modified in 1908 to invade Belgium on the way to Paris but not the Netherlands. It supplied many essential raw materials to Germany such as rubber, tin, quinine, oil and food. The British used its blockade to limit supplies that the Dutch could pass on. There were other factors that made it expedient for both the Allies and the Central Powers for the Netherlands to remain neutral. The Netherlands controlled the mouths of the Scheldt, the Rhine and the Meuse rivers. Germany had an interest in the Rhine since it ran through the industrial areas of the Ruhr and connected it with the Dutch port of Rotterdam. Britain had an interest in the Scheldt and the Meuse flowed from France. All countries had an interest in keeping the others out of the Netherlands so that no one's interests could be taken away or be changed. If one country were to have invaded the Netherlands, another would certainly have counterattacked to defend their own interest in the rivers. It was too big a risk for any of the belligerent nations and none wanted to risk fighting on another front.

The Dutch were affected by the war, troops were mobilized and conscription was introduced in the face of harsh criticism from opposition parties. In 1918, mutinies broke out in the military. Food shortages were extensive, due to the control the belligerents exercised over the Dutch. Each wanted their share of Dutch produce. As a result, the price of potatoes rose sharply because Britain had demanded so much from the Dutch. Food riots even broke out in the country. A big problem was smuggling. When Germany had conquered Belgium, the Allies saw it as enemy territory and stopped exporting to Belgium. Food became scarce for the Belgian people, since the Germans seized all food. This gave the Dutch the opportunity to start to smuggle. This, however, caused great problems in the Netherlands, including inflation and further food shortages. The Allies demanded that the Dutch stop the smuggling, and the government took measures to remain neutral. The government placed many cities under 'state of siege'. On 8 January 1916, a  zone was created by the government along the border. In that zone, goods could be moved on main roads only with a permit. German authorities in Belgium had an electrified fence erected all along the Belgian–Dutch border that caused many refugees from Belgium to lose their lives. The fence was guarded by older German Landsturm soldiers.

Interwar period 

Although both houses of the Dutch Parliament were elected by the people, only men with high incomes were eligible to vote until 1917, when pressure from socialist movements resulted in elections in which all men regardless of income, were entitled to vote. In 1919, women also obtained the right to vote for the first time in history.

The worldwide Great Depression which began after the tumultuous events of Black Tuesday in 1929, that continued into the early-1930s had crippling effects on the Dutch economy; lasting longer than in most other European countries. The long duration of the Great Depression in the Netherlands is often explained by the very strict fiscal policy of the Dutch government at the time, and its decision to adhere to the gold standard for much longer than most of its trading partners. The Great Depression led to high unemployment and widespread poverty, as well as increasing social unrest.

The rise of Nazism in Germany did not go unnoticed in the Netherlands, and there was growing concern at the possibility of armed conflict, but most Dutch people expected that Germany would again respect Dutch neutrality.

There were separate fascist and Nazi movements in the 1930s. Dutch Fascists admired Mussolini's Italy and called for a traditional corporate ideology. The membership was small, elitist and ineffective. The pro-Nazi movement, however, won support from Berlin and attempted to build a mass base by 1935. It failed because most Dutch rejected its racial ideology and calls for violence.

The defence budget was not increased until Germany remilitarised the Rhineland in 1936. The budget was further increased in 1938 (after the annexation of Austria and occupation of the Czech Sudetenland). The colonial government also increased its military budget because of increasing tensions with Japan. The Dutch did not mobilise their armed forces until shortly before France and the UK declared war on Germany in September 1939 after the invasion of Poland. Neutrality was still the official policy, but the Dutch government tried to buy new arms for their badly equipped forces; however, a considerable share of ordered weapons never arrived.

The Second World War (1939–1945)

Nazi invasion and occupation

At the outbreak of World War II in 1939, the Netherlands once again declared its neutrality. However, on 10 May 1940, Nazi Germany launched an attack on the Netherlands and Belgium and quickly overran most of the two countries. Fighting against the Dutch army proved to be more of a burden than foreseen; the northern attack was stopped dead, the one in the middle came to a grinding halt near the Grebbeberg and many airborne assault troops were killed and taken prisoner in the west of the country.
Only in the south were defences broken, but the one passage over the River Maas at Rotterdam was held by the Dutch. By 14 May, fighting in many locations had ceased and the German army could make little or no headway, so the Luftwaffe bombed Rotterdam, the second-largest city of the Netherlands, killing about 900 people, destroying most of the inner city and leaving 78,000 people homeless.

Following the bombing and German threats of the same treatment for Utrecht, the Netherlands capitulated on 15 May, except for the province of Zeeland where French and French-Moroccan troops stood side by side with the Dutch army. Still, the Dutch Royal Family along with some armed forces fled to the United Kingdom. Some members of the Dutch Royal Family eventually moved to Ottawa, Ontario, Canada until the Netherlands was liberated five years later. Princess Margriet was born in Canada, during the period the family spent in exile.

Resentment of the Germans grew as the occupation became harsher, prompting many Dutch in the latter years of the war to join the resistance. But collaboration was not uncommon either; many thousands of young Dutch males volunteered for combat service on the Russian Front with the Waffen-SS and many companies worked for the German occupiers.

Holocaust in the Netherlands

About 140,000 Jews lived in the Netherlands at the beginning of the war. Persecution of Dutch Jews started shortly after the occupation. At the end of the war, 40,000 Jews were still alive. Of the 100,000 Jews who did not go into hiding, about 1,000 survived the war.

The war in the Dutch East Indies

On 8 December 1941, the day after the attack on Pearl Harbor, the Netherlands declared war on Japan. The Dutch government-in-exile in London had for long been working with the UK & US governments to cut off oil supplies to Japan. Japanese forces invaded the Dutch East Indies on 11 January 1942. The Dutch surrendered on 8 March after Japanese troops landed on Java. Dutch citizens and everybody with Dutch ancestry, the so-called "Indo's" were captured and put to work in labour camps or interned. As in the Netherlands, many Dutch ships, planes and military personnel managed to reach safety, in this case to Australia; from where they were able to fight again.

False hopes, the Hunger Winter and Liberation
In Europe, after the Allies landed in Normandy in June 1944, progress was slow until the Battle of Normandy ended in August 1944. German resistance collapsed in Western Europe and the allied armies advanced quickly towards the Dutch border. The First Canadian Army and the Second British Army conducted operations on Dutch soil from September onwards. On 17 September, a daring operation, Operation Market Garden; was executed with the goal of capturing bridges across three major rivers in the southern Netherlands. Despite desperate fighting by American, British and Polish forces, the bridge at Arnhem, across the Neder Rijn, could not be captured.

Areas south of the Rhine river were liberated in the period September–December 1944, including the province of Zeeland, which was liberated in October and November in the Battle of the Scheldt. This opened Antwerp to allied shipping. The First Canadian Army held a static line along the Meuse from December 1944 through February 1945.

The rest of the country remained occupied until the spring of 1945. In the face of Dutch defiance, the Nazis deliberately cut off food supplies resulting in near-starvation in the cities during the Hongerwinter (Hunger winter) of 1944–1945. Soup kitchens were set up but many vulnerable people died. A few days before the Allied victory, the Germans allowed emergency shipments of food.

The First Canadian Army launched Operation Veritable in early-February, cracking the Siegfried Line and reaching the banks of the Rhine in early-March. In the final weeks of the war in Europe, the First Canadian Army was charged with clearing the Netherlands of German forces.

The Liberation of Arnhem began on 12 April 1945 and proceeded to plan, as the three infantry brigades of the 49th Division leapfrogged each other through the city. Within four days Arnhem, now a ruined city, was totally under Allied control.

The Canadians then immediately advanced further into the country, encountering and defeating a German counterattack at Otterlo and Dutch SS resistance at Ede. On 27 April a temporary truce came into effect, allowing the distribution of food aid to the starving Dutch civilians in areas under German control (Operation Manna). On 5 May 1945, Generaloberst Johannes Blaskowitz agreed to the unconditional surrender of all German forces in the Netherlands, signing the surrender to Canadian Lieutenant-General Charles Foulkes at Wageningen. (The Fifth of May is now celebrated annually in the Netherlands as Liberation Day.) Three days later Germany unconditionally surrendered, bringing the war in Europe to an end.

After the euphoria and settling of scores had ended, the Dutch were a traumatised people with a ruined economy, a shattered infrastructure and several destroyed cities including Rotterdam, Nijmegen, Arnhem and part of The Hague.

Post-war events

After the war, there were reprisals against those who had collaborated with the Nazis. Artur Seyss-Inquart, Nazi Commissioner of the Netherlands, was tried at Nüremberg.

In the early post-war years, the Netherlands made continued attempts to expand its territory by annexing neighbouring German territory. The larger annexation plans were continuously rejected by the United States, but the London conference of 1949 permitted the Netherlands to perform a smaller scale annexation. Most of the annexed territory was returned to Germany on 1 August 1963 after Germany paid the Netherlands 280 million German marks.

Operation Black Tulip was a plan in 1945 by Dutch Minister of Justice Kolfschoten to evict all Germans from the Netherlands. The operation lasted from 1946 to 1948 and in the end 3,691 Germans (15% of Germans resident in the Netherlands) were deported. The operation started on 10 September 1946 in Amsterdam, where Germans and their families were taken from their homes in the middle of the night and given one hour to collect 50 kg of luggage. They were allowed to take 100 guilders. The rest of their possessions went to the state. They were taken to concentration camps near the German border, the biggest of which was Mariënbosch concentration camp near Nijmegen.

Prosperity and European Unity (1945–present)
The post-war years were a time of hardship, shortages and natural disaster. This was followed by large-scale public works programmes, economic recovery, European integration and the gradual introduction of a welfare state.

Immediately after the war, rationing was imposed on many goods, including: cigarettes, textiles, washing powder and coffee. Even traditional wooden shoes were rationed. There was severe housing shortages in the Netherlands as a result of the war. In the 1950s, there was mass emigration, especially to Canada, Australia and New Zealand. Government-encouraged emigration efforts to reduce population density prompted some 500,000 Dutch people to leave the country after the war. The Netherlands failed to hold the Dutch East Indies, as Indonesia became independent and 300,000 Dutch inhabitants (and their Indonesian allies) left the islands.

Post-war politics saw shifting coalition governments. The 1946 Parliamentary elections saw the Catholic People's Party (KVP) emerge as the largest party, just ahead of the socialist Labour party (PvdA). Louis J. M. Beel formed a new coalition cabinet. The United States began providing economic assistance as part of the Marshall Plan in 1948 that injected valuable funds into the economy, fostered modernisation of business, and encouraged economic cooperation.

The 1948 elections led to a new coalition led by Labor's Willem Drees. He led four successive cabinets Drees I, Drees II, Drees III and Drees IV until 1958. His tenure in office saw four major political developments: the traumas of decolonisation, economic reconstruction, the establishment of the Dutch welfare state, and international integration and co-operation, including the formation of Benelux, the OEEC, NATO, the ECSC, and the EEC.

Baby boom and economic reconstruction

Despite the socio-economic problems, this was a period of optimism for many. A baby boom followed the war, as young Dutch couples started the families they could not previously due to the war. They had lived through the hardships of the Great Depression and the hell of war. They wanted to start afresh and live better lives without the poverty, starvation, terror, and extreme frugality they knew so well. They had little taste for a strictly imposed rule-oriented traditional system with its rigid hierarchies, sharp pillarised boundaries and strictly orthodox religious doctrines. The translation of The Common Sense Book of Baby and Child Care (1946), by American pediatrician Benjamin Spock was a best-seller. His vision of family life as companionate, permissive, enjoyable and even as being fun took hold, and seemed the best way to achieve family happiness in a dawning age of freedom and prosperity.

Wages were kept low and the recovery of consumption to pre-war levels was delayed to permit rapid rebuilding of the infrastructure. In the years after the war, unemployment fell and the economy grew at an astonishing pace, despite the high birth rate. The shattered infrastructure and destroyed cities were rebuilt. A key contribution to the recovery in the post-war Netherlands came from the Marshall Plan, which provided the country with funds, goods, raw materials and produce.

The Dutch became internationally active again. Dutch corporations, particularly Royal Dutch Shell and Philips, became internationally prominent. Businesspeople, scientists, engineers and artists from the Netherlands made important international contributions. For example, Dutch economists, especially Jan Tinbergen (1903–1994), Tjalling Koopmans (1910–1985) and Henri Theil (1924–2000), made major contributions to the mathematical and statistical methodology known as econometrics.

Across Western Europe, the period from 1973 to 1981 marked the end of the booming economy of the 1960s. The Netherlands also experienced years of negative growth after that. Unemployment increased steadily, causing rapid growth in social-security expenditures. Inflation reached double digits; government surpluses disappeared. On the positive side, rich natural gas resources were developed, providing a current account trade surplus during most of the period. Public deficits were high. According to the long-term economic analysis of Horlings and Smits, the major gains in the Dutch economy were concentrated between 1870–1930 and between 1950 and 1970. Rates were much lower in 1930–1945 and after 1987.

Flood control

The last major flood in the Netherlands took place in early-February 1953, when a huge storm caused the collapse of several dikes in the southwest of the Netherlands. More than 1,800 people drowned in the ensuing inundation.

The Dutch government subsequently decided on a large-scale programme of public works (the "Delta Works") to protect the country against future floods. The project took more than thirty years to complete. The Oosterscheldedam, an advanced sea storm barrier, became operational in 1986. The national Delta programme continues to manage these works for the government under an independent Commissioner, with the aim of making the Netherlands climate-proof and water-resilient by 2050.

Europeanisation, Americanisation and internationalisation
The European Coal and Steel Community (ECSC), was founded in 1951 by the six founding members: Belgium, the Netherlands and Luxembourg (the Benelux countries) and West Germany, France and Italy. Its purpose was to pool the steel and coal resources of the member states, and to support the economies of the participating countries. As a side effect, the ECSC helped defuse tensions between countries which had recently been fighting each other during the war. In time, this economic merger grew, adding members and broadening in scope, to become the European Economic Community, and later the European Union (EU).

The United States started to have more influence. After the war, higher education changed from a German model to more of an American-influenced model. American influences had been small in the interwar era, and during the war, the Nazis had emphasised the dangers of a "degraded" American culture as represented by jazz. However, the Dutch became more attracted to the United States during the post-war era, perhaps partly because of antipathy towards the Nazis but certainly because of American films and consumer goods. The Marshall Plan also introduced the Dutch to American management practices. NATO brought in American military doctrine and technology. Intellectuals, artists and the political left, however, remained more reserved about the Americans. According to Rob Kroes, the anti-Americanism in the Netherlands was ambiguous: American culture was both accepted and criticised at the same time.

The Netherlands is a founding member of the EU, NATO, OECD and WTO. Together with Belgium and Luxembourg it forms the Benelux economic union. The country is host to the Organisation for the Prohibition of Chemical Weapons and five international courts: the Permanent Court of Arbitration, the International Court of Justice, the International Criminal Tribunal for the Former Yugoslavia, the International Criminal Court and the Special Tribunal for Lebanon. The first four are situated in The Hague, as is the EU's criminal intelligence agency Europol and judicial co-operation agency Eurojust. This has led to the city being dubbed "the world's legal capital".

Decolonisation and multiculturalism

The Dutch East Indies had long been a valuable resource to the Netherlands, generating about 14% of the Dutch national income in the 1930s, and was home to thousands of Dutch people and officials, businessmen and missionaries. By the first half of the twentieth century, new organisations and leadership had developed in the Dutch East Indies. Under its Ethical Policy, the government had helped create an educated Indonesian elite. These profound changes constituted the "Indonesian National Revival". Increased political activism and Japanese occupation undermined Dutch rule culminated in nationalists proclaiming independence on 17 August 1945, two days after the surrender of Japan. The Dutch did not plan to let go of Indonesia. However, the Netherlands was much too weak to reconquer the country. The Japanese had imprisoned all the Dutch residents, and turned the islands over to a native government, which was widely popular. The British military arrived to disarm the Japanese. The Dutch finally returned and attempted to eradicate the Indonesian National Revolution with force, sometimes brutal in nature as exemplified by the Rawagede massacre.

Hundreds of thousands of Indonesians supported the Dutch position; when Independence finally arrived, most of them were relocated to the Netherlands. The UK mediated a compromise signed in March 1947 whereby de facto control of the new Indonesian Republic was acknowledged over Java, Maduro and Sumatra, while acknowledging Dutch control over the numerous smaller and far less important islands. Supposedly there would be a federated Indonesian state and a union with the Netherlands, but that never happened. The Indonesians wanted complete transfer of power, and the Dutch refused. By 1946, the United States was financing the Dutch in Indonesia, and was able to exert pressure on The Hague. Increasing international pressure—including American hints about cutting off military funds—forced the Netherlands to withdraw. A decisive episode was the success of the Indonesian Republic in crushing a Communist revolt. Washington now realised that Indonesia was part of the Cold War fight against communism, and the Indonesian government was a necessary ally—and that the Dutch tactics were counterproductive and chaotic, and could only provide help to Communist insurgencies. The Netherlands formally recognised Indonesian independence on 27 December 1949. Public opinion blamed Washington for the Dutch colonial failure. Only Irian, the western half of New Guinea remained under Dutch control as Dutch New Guinea until 1961, when the Netherlands transferred sovereignty of this area to Indonesia.

During and after the Indonesian National Revolution, over 350,000 people, left Indonesia for the Netherlands. This included 250,000 Europeans and "Indos" (Dutch-Indonesian Eurasians), Along with 100,000 military conscripts, and 12,000 South Moluccans who settled in the Netherlands. Similarly after independence in 1975, 115,000 Surinamese migrated to the Netherlands. This out-migration occurred in five distinct waves over a period of 20 years. It included Indos (many of whom spent the war years in Japanese concentration camps), former South Moluccan soldiers and their families, "New-Guinea Issue" Dutch citizens, Dutch citizens from Dutch New Guinea (including Papuan civil servants and their families), and other Indos who had remained behind but later regretted their decision to take out Indonesian citizenship.

The Indos of Indonesian descent (now numbering around 680,000) is the largest ethnic minority group in the Netherlands. They are integrated into Dutch society, but they have also retained many aspects of their culture and have added a distinct Indonesian flavour to the Netherlands.

Although it was originally feared that the loss of the Dutch East Indies would contribute to an economic decline, the Dutch economy experienced exceptional growth (partly because a disproportionate amount of Marshall Plan aid was received) in the 1950s and 1960s. In fact, the demand for labour was so strong that immigration was actively encouraged, first from Italy and Spain then later on, in larger numbers, from Turkey and Morocco.

Suriname became independent on 25 November 1975. The Dutch government supported independence because it wanted to stem the flow of immigrants from Suriname and also to end its colonial status. However, about one-third of the entire population of Suriname, fearing political unrest and economic decline, relocated to the Netherlands, creating a Surinamese community in the Netherlands that is now roughly as large as the population of Suriname itself.

Liberalisation
When the post-war baby boom children grew up, they led the revolt in the 1960s against all rigidities in Dutch life. The 1960s and 1970s were a time of great social and cultural change, such as rapid de-pillarization leading to the erosion of the old divisions along class and religious lines. A youth culture emerged all across Western Europe and the United States, characterised by student rebellion, informality, sexual freedom, informal clothes, new hairstyles, protest music, drugs and idealism. Young people, and students in particular, rejected traditional mores, and pushed for change over matters such as: women's rights, sexuality, disarmament and environmental issues.

Secularisation, or the decline in religiosity, first became noticeable after 1960 in the Protestant rural areas of Friesland and Groningen. Then, it spread to Amsterdam, Rotterdam and the other major cities in the west. Finally, the Catholic southern areas showed religious decline. As the social distance between the Calvinists and Catholics narrowed (and they began to intermarry), it became possible to merge their parties. The Anti-Revolutionary Party (ARP) in 1977 merged with the Catholic People's Party (KVP) and the Protestant Christian Historical Union (CHU) to form the Christian Democratic Appeal (CDA). However, a countervailing trend later appeared as the result of a religious revival in the Protestant Bible Belt, and the growth of the Muslim and Hindu communities as a result of immigration from overseas and high fertility levels.

After 1982, there was a retrenchment of the welfare system, especially regarding old-age pensions, unemployment benefits, and disability pensions/early retirement benefits.

Following the 1994 general election, in which the Christian democratic CDA lost a considerable portion of its representatives, the social-liberal Democrats 66 (D66) doubled in size and formed a coalition with the labour party (Netherlands) (PvdA), and the People's Party for Freedom and Democracy (VVD). This purple (government) coalition marked the first absence of the CDA in a government for decades. During the Purple Coalition years, a period lasting until the rise of the populist politician Pim Fortuyn, the government addressed issues previously viewed as taboo under the Christian-influenced cabinet. At this time, the Dutch government introduced unprecedented legislation based on a policy of official tolerance (gedoogbeleid). Abortion and euthanasia were decriminalised, but stricter guidelines were set for their implementation. Drug policy, especially with regard to the regulation of cannabis, was reformed. Prostitution was legalised, but confined to brothels where the health and safety of those involved could be properly monitored. With the 2001 Same-Sex Marriage Act, the Netherlands became the first country in the world to legalise same-sex marriage. In addition to social reforms, the Purple Coalition also presided over a period of remarkable economic prosperity.

Recent politics

At the 1998 general election, the Purple Coalition consisting of Social Democrats, and left and right-wing Liberals, increased its majority. Both the social democratic PvdA and the conservative liberal VVD grew at the cost of their junior partner in cabinet, the progressive liberal D66. The voters rewarded the Purple Coalition for its economic performance, which had included reduction of unemployment and the budget deficit, steady growth and job creation combined with wage freezes and trimming of the welfare state, together with a policy of fiscal restraint. The result was the second Kok cabinet.

The power of the coalition waned with the introduction of List Pim Fortuyn in the Dutch general election of 2002, a populist party, which ran a distinctly anti-immigration and anti-purple campaign, citing "Purple Chaos" (Puinhopen van Paars) as the source of the countries social woes. In the first political assassination for three centuries, Fortuyn was murdered with little over a week left before the election. In the wake of its leader's death, LPF swept the elections, entering parliament with one-sixth of the seats, while the PvdA (Labour) lost half of its seats. The ensuing cabinet was formed by CDA, VVD and LPF, led by Prime Minister Jan Peter Balkenende. Though the party succeeded in displacing the rival Purple Coalition, without the charismatic figure of Pim Fortuyn at its helm, it proved to be short-lived; lasting a mere 87 days in government.

Two events changed the political landscape:
 On 6 May 2002, the assassination of Politician Pim Fortuyn, calling for a very strict policy on immigration, shocked the nation, not at all used to political violence in peacetime. His party won a landslide election victory, partly because of his perceived martyrdom, However, internal party squabbles and blowing up the coalition government they had helped to create, resulted in the loss of 70% of their support at early general elections in 2003.
 Another murder that caused great upheaval took place on 2 November 2004, when film director and publicist Theo van Gogh was assassinated by a Dutch-Moroccan youth with Islamic extremist views because of Van Gogh's alleged blasphemy. One week later, several arrests were made of several would-be Islamic terrorists, who have later been found guilty of conspiracy with terrorist intentions, this verdict was however reversed on appeal. All this sparked a debate on the position of Islamic extremism and of Islam generally in Dutch society, and on immigration and integration. The personal protection of most politicians, especially of the Islam critic Ayaan Hirsi Ali, was stepped up to unprecedented levels.

21st century

By 2000, the population had increased to 15,900,000 people, making the Netherlands one of the most densely-populated countries in the world. Urban development has led to the development of a conurbation called the Randstad, which includes the four largest cities (Amsterdam, Rotterdam, The Hague and Utrecht), and the surrounding areas. With a population of 7,100,000; it is one of the largest conurbations in Europe.

On 26 December 2004 during the Boxing Day celebration, many hundreds of several Dutch people in Thailand and the other part across of South and Southeast Asia were among thousands of people killed by the magnitude 9.0 earthquake and tsunami off Indonesian island's west coast of Sumatra, which suffered from the significant loss of Dutch lives. A memorial service held at Basilica of St. Nicholas Cathedral in Amsterdam in January 2005 was held on behalf of the Queen of the Netherlands.

This small nation has successfully developed into one of the most open, dynamic and prosperous countries in the world. It had the tenth-highest per capita income in the world in 2011. It has an open, market-based mixed economy, ranking thirteenth out of 157 countries according to the Index of Economic Freedom. In May 2011, the OECD ranked the Netherlands as the "happiest" country in the world.

On Koningsdag (King's Day), 30 April 2013, Prince Willem Alexander appointed as the King, having ascended the throne following his mother's abdication, Queen Beatrix. At the time of her abdication at age 75, Beatrix was the oldest reigning monarch in the country's history.

On 17 July 2014, 193 Dutch people are among 298 people on aboard were killed in the Malaysia Airlines Flight MH17 plane shot down by the air-surface missile in Eastern Ukraine near Russian border. A referendum on the approval of the Association Agreement between the European Union and Ukraine was held in The Hague on 6 April 2016.

VVD Prime Minister Mark Rutte won the 2017 general election and formed a third government and was in first few months challenged after the People's Party for Freedom and Democracy voted since 2006.

In late January 2020, Netherlands has confirmed the first case of COVID-19. However, in March, Netherlands went to the national lockdowns, causing the temporary closure of all bars and restaurants, theatres, entertainment venues, hairdresser shops, businesses, and schools. The economic downtown in the Netherlands was even worse than the Great Recession in 2008. Merkel's government imposed a national lockdown to combat the spread of the virus. Despite being widely approved by public opinion, COVID-19 measures, such as social distancing and wearing face masks, were described as the largest suppression of constitutional rights in the nation's history. Also, Dutch government was commended for being an effective model for instituting methods of curbing infections and deaths, but lost this status by the end of the year due to a rising number of cases. As of result, COVID-19 pandemic in the Netherlands was greatly affected Dutch economic, cultural, and media society with over 1.6 million confirmed cases and over 17,745 deaths (As of July 2021).

In December 2020, COVID-19 vaccines has reached the Netherlands and then began to be administered. However, many restrictions in the Netherlands were lifted by June 2021 (and again by 1 April 2022 (Due to COVID-19 Deltacron hybrid variant)).

In March 2021, centre-right VVD of Prime Minister Mark Rutte was the winner of the elections, securing 35 out of 150 seats. The second biggest party was the centre-left D66 with 24 seats. Geert Wilders' far-right party lost its support. Prime Minister Mark Rutte, in power since 2010, formed his fourth coalition government.

Historians and historiography

Historians
 Julia Adams, economic and social history
 Petrus Johannes Blok, survey
 J. C. H. Blom, survey
 M. R. Boxell, political history
 Pieter Geyl, Dutch revolt; historiography
 Johan Huizinga (1872–1945), cultural history
 Jonathan Israel, Dutch Republic, Age of Enlightenment, Baruch Spinoza
 Louis De Jong, World War II
 John Lothrop Motley, American historian of the Dutch Revolt
 Jan Romein (1893–1962), theoretical and world history
 Jan de Vries, economic history

Historiography
The American John Lothrop Motley was the first foreign historian to write a major history of the Dutch Republic. In 3500 pages he crafted a literary masterpiece that was translated into numerous languages; his dramatic story reached a wide audience in the 19th century. Motley relied heavily on Dutch scholarship and immersed himself in the sources. His style no longer attracts readers, and scholars have moved away from his simplistic dichotomies of good versus evil, Dutch versus Spanish, Catholic versus Protestant, freedom versus authoritarianism. His theory of causation over-emphasized ethnicity as an unchanging characteristic, exaggerated the importance of William of Orange, and gave undue importance to the issue of religious tolerance.

The pioneering Dutch cultural historian Johan Huizinga, author of The Autumn of the Middle Ages (1919) (the English translation was called The Waning of the Middle Ages) and Homo Ludens: A Study of the Play Element in Culture (1935), which expanded the field of cultural history and influenced the historical anthropology of younger historians of the French Annales School. He was influenced by art history and advised historians to trace "patterns of culture" by studying "themes, figures, motifs, symbols, styles and sentiments."

The "polder model" continues to strongly influence historians as well as Dutch political discussion. The polder model stressed the need for finding consensus and discouraged furious debate and angry dissent in both academia and politics – in contrast to the highly developed, intense debates in Germany.

The H-Net list H-Low-Countries is published free by email and is edited by scholars. Its occasional messages serve an international community with diverse methodological approaches, archival experiences, teaching styles, and intellectual traditions, promotes discussion relevant to the region and to the different national histories in particular, with an emphasis on the Netherlands. H-Low-Countries publishes conference announcements, questions and discussions; reviews of books, journals, and articles; and tables of contents of journals on the history of the Low Countries (in both Dutch and English). After World War II both research-oriented and teaching-oriented historians have been rethinking their interpretive approaches to Dutch history, balancing traditional memories and modern scholarship. In terms of popular history, there has been an effort to ensure greater historical accuracy in museums and historic tourist sites.

Once heralded as the leading event of modern Dutch history, the Dutch Revolt lasted from 1568 to 1648, and historians have worked to interpret it for even longer. In 2007, Laura Cruz explained the major debates among scholars regarding the Dutch bid for independence from Spanish rule. While agreeing that the intellectual milieus of late 19th and 20th centuries affected historians' interpretations, Cruz argued that writings about the revolt trace changing perceptions of the role played by small countries in the history of Europe. In recent decades grand theory has fallen out of favor among most scholars, who emphasize the particular over the general. Dutch and Belgian historiography since 1945 no longer says the revolt was the culmination of an inevitable process leading to independence and freedom. Instead scholars have put the political and economic details of the towns and provinces under the microscope, while agreeing on the weaknesses of attempts at centralization by the Habsburg rulers. The most influential new studies have been rooted in demographic and economic history, though scholars continue to debate the relationship between economics and politics. The religious dimension has been viewed in terms of mentalities, exposing the minority position of Calvinism, while the international aspects have been studied more seriously by foreign historians than by the Dutch themselves.

Pieter Geyl was the leading historian of the Dutch Revolt, and an influential professor at the University of London (1919–1935) and at the State University of Utrecht (1936–1958). He wrote a six-volume history of the Dutch-speaking peoples. The Nazis imprisoned him in World War II. In his political views, Geyl adopted the views of the 17th-century Dutch Louvestein faction, led by Johan van Oldenbarneveldt and Johan de Witt. It stood for liberty, toleration, and national interests in contrast to the Orange stadholders who sought to promote their own self-interest. According to Geyl, the Dutch Republic reached the peak of its powers during the 17th century. He was also a staunch nationalist and suggested that Flanders could split off from Belgium and join the Netherlands. Later he decried what he called radical nationalism and stressed more the vitality of Western Civilization. Geyl was highly critical of the world history approach of Arnold J. Toynbee.

Jan Romein created a "theoretical history" in an attempt to reestablish the relevance of history to public life in the 1930s at a time of immense political uncertainty and cultural crisis, when Romein thought that history had become too inward-looking and isolated from other disciplines. Romein, a Marxist, wanted history to contribute to social improvement. At the same time, influenced by the successes of theoretical physics and his study of Oswald Spengler, Arnold J. Toynbee, Frederick John Teggart, and others, he spurred on the development of theoretical history in the Netherlands, to the point where it became a subject in its own right at the university level after the war. Romein used the term integral history as a substitute for cultural history and focused his attention on the period around the turn of the century. He concluded that a serious crisis occurred in European civilization in 1900 because of the rise of anti-Semitism, extreme nationalism, discontent with the parliamentary system, depersonalization of the state, and the rejection of positivism. European civilization waned as the result of this crisis which was accompanied by the rise of the United States, the Americanization of the world, and the emergence of Asia. His interpretation is reminiscent of that of his mentor Johan Huizinga and was criticized by his colleague Pieter Geyl.

See also

 Canon of the Netherlands
 Culture of the Netherlands
 Demographics of the Netherlands
 Dutch diaspora
 Dutch East Indies
 Dutch Empire
 Economy of the Netherlands
 Geography of the European Netherlands
 History of Belgium
 History of religion in the Netherlands
 History of Europe
 History of Germany
 History of Luxembourg
 List of prime ministers of the Netherlands
 List of monarchs of the Netherlands
 Politics of the Netherlands
 Provinces of the Netherlands
 Netherlands in World War II

Notes

Further reading 
See also: 

 
 
 
 
 
 
 

 t'Hart Zanden, Marjolein et al. A financial history of the Netherlands (Cambridge University Press, 1997).

 
 
 
 Kennedy, James C.  A Concise History of The Netherlands. Cambridge: Cambridge University Press 2017. ISBN 978-05210699174
 
 
 , Detailed survey
 
 
 
 
 
 , history of towns in the Low Countries
 
 , broad survey

Geography and environment

 
 , focus on the history of land reclamation

External links 

 Chronologisch overzicht van de Nederlandse geschiedenis (in Dutch)
 De Tachtigjarige Oorlog (in Dutch)
 Dutch Crossing: Journal of Low Countries Studies, a scholarly journal
 History of Holland, George Edmundson, 1922, Project Gutenberg EBook.
 History of the Netherlands from 50 BC to 2005
 History of Netherlands: Primary Documents
 Netherlands Institute for War Documentation
 Netherlands: Maps, History, Geography, Government, Culture, Facts, Guide & Travel | Infoplease.com
 Overview of historical novels about The Netherlands and Belgium
 Short survey of the Dutch history
 The Canon of the Netherlands.
 The Netherlands in prehistory
 Timeline from 1914
 Official Netherlands Stories website
 Virtual Tour of Dutch History (101 Sites in Google Earth with Links) 
 Netherlands Geographic Information System (1812–1997)

 
Articles which contain graphical timelines